= Artelida fuscosericans =

Scientific classification
- Kingdom: Animalia
- Phylum: Arthropoda
- Class: Insecta
- Order: Coleoptera
- Suborder: Polyphaga
- Infraorder: Cucujiformia
- Family: Cerambycidae
- Genus: Artelida
- Species: A. fuscosericans

Binomial name
- Artelida fuscosericans Fairmaire, 1902

Species of beetle

Artelida fuscosericans is a species of beetle in the family Cerambycidae. It was described by Fairmaire in 1902.
