= Lepturovespa calceata =

Scientific classification
- Kingdom: Animalia
- Phylum: Arthropoda
- Clade: Pancrustacea
- Class: Insecta
- Order: Coleoptera
- Suborder: Polyphaga
- Infraorder: Cucujiformia
- Family: Cerambycidae
- Subfamily: Apatophyseinae
- Tribe: Apatophyseini
- Genus: Lepturovespa
- Species: L. calceata

Binomial name
- Lepturovespa calceata (Fairmaire, 1901)

Synonyms
- Eccrisis calceata (Fairmaire, 1901); Myiodola calceata Boppe, 1921; Myiodola calceata Fairmaire, 1901

Species of beetle

Lepturovespa calceata is a species in the longhorn beetle family Cerambycidae. It is native to Madagascar.
