= Artelida rubicunda =

Scientific classification
- Kingdom: Animalia
- Phylum: Arthropoda
- Class: Insecta
- Order: Coleoptera
- Suborder: Polyphaga
- Infraorder: Cucujiformia
- Family: Cerambycidae
- Genus: Artelida
- Species: A. rubicunda

Binomial name
- Artelida rubicunda Fairmaire, 1903

Species of beetle

Artelida rubicunda is a species of beetle in the family Cerambycidae. It was described by Fairmaire in 1903.
