= Scopanta plicicollis =

Scientific classification
- Kingdom: Animalia
- Phylum: Arthropoda
- Clade: Pancrustacea
- Class: Insecta
- Order: Coleoptera
- Suborder: Polyphaga
- Infraorder: Cucujiformia
- Family: Cerambycidae
- Subfamily: Apatophyseinae
- Tribe: Apatophyseini
- Genus: Scopanta
- Species: S. plicicollis

Binomial name
- Scopanta plicicollis (Fairmaire, 1901)

Synonyms
- Logisticus plicicollis Aurivillius, 1912

Species of beetle

Scopanta plicicollis is a species in the longhorn beetle family Cerambycidae. It is found in Madagascar.
