= Pseudogenes ornaticeps =

Scientific classification
- Kingdom: Animalia
- Phylum: Arthropoda
- Clade: Pancrustacea
- Class: Insecta
- Order: Coleoptera
- Suborder: Polyphaga
- Infraorder: Cucujiformia
- Family: Cerambycidae
- Subfamily: Apatophyseinae
- Tribe: Apatophyseini
- Genus: Pseudogenes
- Species: P. ornaticeps

Binomial name
- Pseudogenes ornaticeps Fairmaire, 1894

Species of beetle

Pseudogenes ornaticeps is a species in the longhorn beetle family Cerambycidae. It is native to Madagascar.
