= Soalalana cribata =

Scientific classification
- Kingdom: Animalia
- Phylum: Arthropoda
- Clade: Pancrustacea
- Class: Insecta
- Order: Coleoptera
- Suborder: Polyphaga
- Infraorder: Cucujiformia
- Family: Cerambycidae
- Subfamily: Apatophyseinae
- Tribe: Apatophyseini
- Genus: Soalalana
- Species: S. cribata

Binomial name
- Soalalana cribata (Vives, 2003)

Synonyms
- Artelida cribata Vives, 2003

Species of beetle

Soalalana cribata is a species in the longhorn beetle family Cerambycidae. It is found in Madagascar.
