= Artelida nobilitata =

Scientific classification
- Kingdom: Animalia
- Phylum: Arthropoda
- Class: Insecta
- Order: Coleoptera
- Suborder: Polyphaga
- Infraorder: Cucujiformia
- Family: Cerambycidae
- Genus: Artelida
- Species: A. nobilitata

Binomial name
- Artelida nobilitata Nonfried, 1891

Species of beetle

Artelida nobilitata is a species of beetle in the family Cerambycidae. It was described by Nonfried in 1891.
