= Pseudomusius rubricollis =

Scientific classification
- Kingdom: Animalia
- Phylum: Arthropoda
- Clade: Pancrustacea
- Class: Insecta
- Order: Coleoptera
- Suborder: Polyphaga
- Infraorder: Cucujiformia
- Family: Cerambycidae
- Subfamily: Apatophyseinae
- Tribe: Apatophyseini
- Genus: Pseudomusius
- Species: P. rubricollis

Binomial name
- Pseudomusius rubricollis (Fairmaire, 1899)

Synonyms
- Musius rubricollis Aurivillius, 1912

Species of beetle

Pseudomusius rubricollis is a species in the longhorn beetle family Cerambycidae. It is native to Madagascar.
