= Pseudogenes (beetle) =

Scientific classification
- Kingdom: Animalia
- Phylum: Arthropoda
- Class: Insecta
- Order: Coleoptera
- Suborder: Polyphaga
- Infraorder: Cucujiformia
- Family: Cerambycidae
- Subfamily: Apatophyseinae
- Tribe: Apatophyseini
- Genus: Pseudogenes; Fairmaire, 1894

Genus of beetles

Pseudogenes is a genus in the longhorn beetle family Cerambycidae. There are at least two described species in Pseudogenes, found in Madagascar.

== Species ==
These two species belong to the genus Pseudogenes:

- Pseudogenes micheli Villiers, Quentin & Vives, 2011
- Pseudogenes ornaticeps Fairmaire, 1894
