= Logisticus pachydermus =

Scientific classification
- Kingdom: Animalia
- Phylum: Arthropoda
- Class: Insecta
- Order: Coleoptera
- Suborder: Polyphaga
- Infraorder: Cucujiformia
- Family: Cerambycidae
- Genus: Logisticus
- Species: L. pachydermus

Binomial name
- Logisticus pachydermus Fairmaire, 1893

Species of beetle

Logisticus pachydermus is a species of beetle in the family Cerambycidae. It was described by Fairmaire in 1893.
