= Phitryonus cyanipennis =

Scientific classification
- Kingdom: Animalia
- Phylum: Arthropoda
- Clade: Pancrustacea
- Class: Insecta
- Order: Coleoptera
- Suborder: Polyphaga
- Infraorder: Cucujiformia
- Family: Cerambycidae
- Subfamily: Apatophyseinae
- Tribe: Apatophyseini
- Genus: Phitryonus
- Species: P. cyanipennis

Binomial name
- Phitryonus cyanipennis Fairmaire, 1903

Species of beetle

Phitryonus cyanipennis is a species in the longhorn beetle family Cerambycidae. It is found in Madagascar.
