= Soalalana =

Scientific classification
- Kingdom: Animalia
- Phylum: Arthropoda
- Class: Insecta
- Order: Coleoptera
- Suborder: Polyphaga
- Infraorder: Cucujiformia
- Family: Cerambycidae
- Subfamily: Apatophyseinae
- Tribe: Apatophyseini
- Genus: Soalalana; Villiers, Quentin & Vives, 2011

Genus of beetles

Soalalana is a genus in the longhorn beetle family Cerambycidae. There are at least two described species in Soalalana, found in Madagascar.

== Species ==
These two species belong to the genus Soalalana:

- Soalalana alboscutata (Fairmaire, 1904)
- Soalalana cribata (Vives, 2003)
