= Artelida cribata =

Scientific classification
- Kingdom: Animalia
- Phylum: Arthropoda
- Class: Insecta
- Order: Coleoptera
- Suborder: Polyphaga
- Infraorder: Cucujiformia
- Family: Cerambycidae
- Genus: Artelida
- Species: A. cribata

Binomial name
- Artelida cribata Vives, 2003

Species of beetle

Artelida cribata is a species of beetle in the family Cerambycidae, described by Vives in 2003.
