= Echaristha =

Scientific classification
- Kingdom: Animalia
- Phylum: Arthropoda
- Class: Insecta
- Order: Coleoptera
- Suborder: Polyphaga
- Infraorder: Cucujiformia
- Family: Cerambycidae
- Subfamily: Apatophyseinae
- Tribe: Apatophyseini
- Genus: Echaristha; Fairmaire, 1901

Genus of beetles

Echaristha is a genus in the longhorn beetle family Cerambycidae. There are at least two described species in Echaristha, found in Madagascar.

== Species ==
These two species belong to the genus Echaristha:

- Echaristha bilobata Villiers, Quentin & Vives, 2011
- Echaristha pictipennis Fairmaire, 1901
