= Sagridola luteicornis =

Scientific classification
- Kingdom: Animalia
- Phylum: Arthropoda
- Clade: Pancrustacea
- Class: Insecta
- Order: Coleoptera
- Suborder: Polyphaga
- Infraorder: Cucujiformia
- Family: Cerambycidae
- Genus: Sagridola
- Species: S. luteicornis

Binomial name
- Sagridola luteicornis Boppe, 1921

Species of beetle

Sagridola luteicornis is a species of beetle in the family Cerambycidae. It was described by Boppe in 1921.
