= Phyllotodes =

Scientific classification
- Domain: Eukaryota
- Kingdom: Animalia
- Phylum: Arthropoda
- Class: Insecta
- Order: Coleoptera
- Suborder: Polyphaga
- Infraorder: Cucujiformia
- Family: Cerambycidae
- Tribe: Apatophyseini
- Genus: Phyllotodes; Adlbauer, 2001
- Species: P. obliquefasciatus

Binomial name
- Phyllotodes obliquefasciatus Adlbauer, 2001

Genus of beetles

Phyllotodes is a genus in the longhorn beetle family Cerambycidae. This genus has a single species, Phyllotodes obliquefasciatus. It is found in Madagascar.
