= Scopanta rufula =

Scientific classification
- Kingdom: Animalia
- Phylum: Arthropoda
- Class: Insecta
- Order: Coleoptera
- Suborder: Polyphaga
- Infraorder: Cucujiformia
- Family: Cerambycidae
- Genus: Scopanta
- Species: S. rufula

Binomial name
- Scopanta rufula Fairmaire, 1893

Species of beetle

Scopanta rufula is a species of beetle in the family Cerambycidae. It was described by Fairmaire in 1893.
