= Xanthopiodus angulicollis =

Scientific classification
- Kingdom: Animalia
- Phylum: Arthropoda
- Class: Insecta
- Order: Coleoptera
- Suborder: Polyphaga
- Infraorder: Cucujiformia
- Family: Cerambycidae
- Genus: Xanthopiodus
- Species: X. angulicollis

Binomial name
- Xanthopiodus angulicollis Fairmaire, 1897

Species of beetle

Xanthopiodus angulicollis is a species of beetle in the family Cerambycidae. It was described by Fairmaire in 1897.
