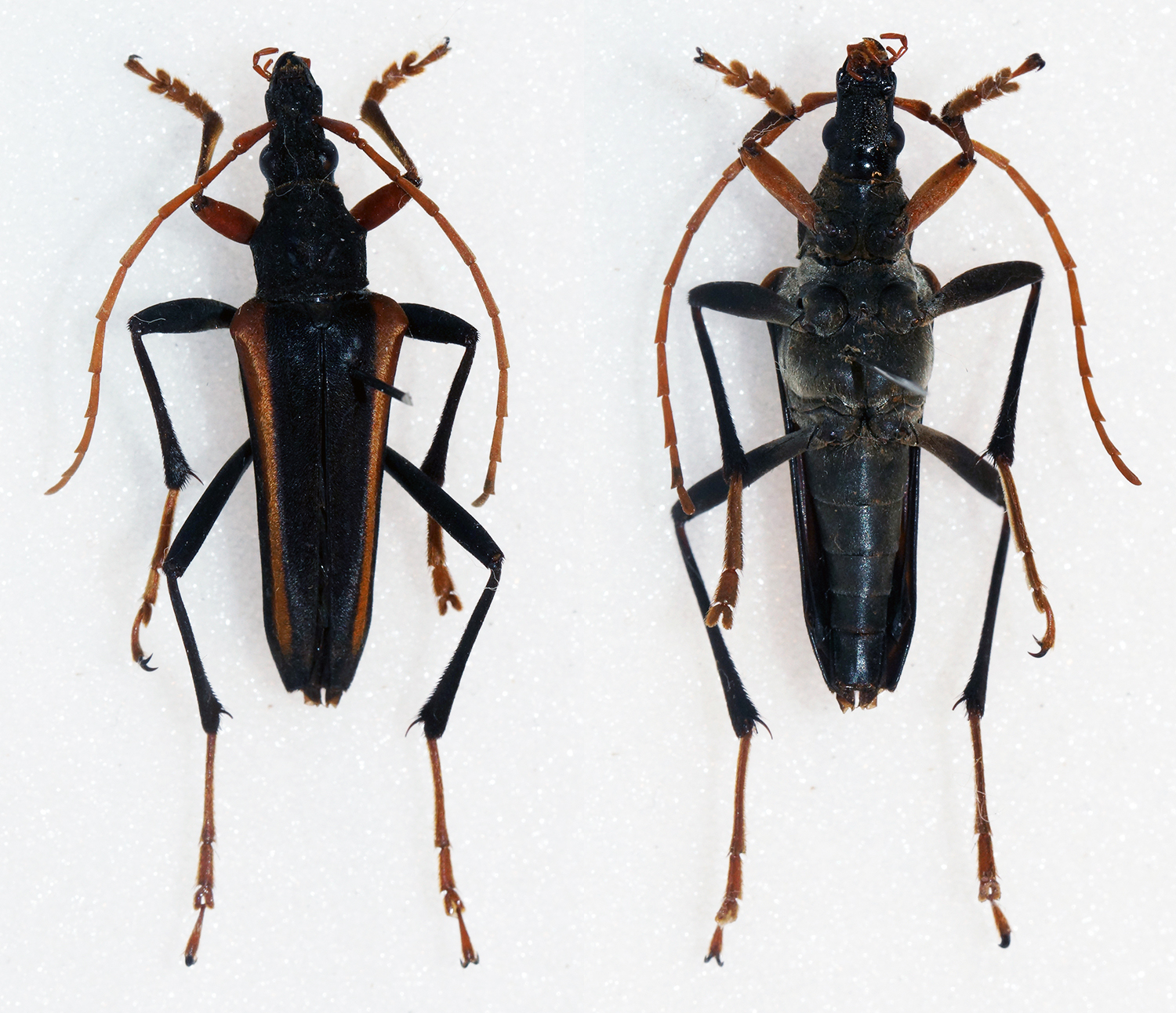

Scientific classification
- Kingdom: Animalia
- Phylum: Arthropoda
- Class: Insecta
- Order: Coleoptera
- Suborder: Polyphaga
- Infraorder: Cucujiformia
- Family: Cerambycidae
- Genus: Tsivoka
- Species: T. simplicicollis

Binomial name
- Tsivoka simplicicollis (Gahan, 1890)

= Tsivoka simplicicollis =

Species of beetle

Tsivoka simplicicollis is a species of beetle in the family Cerambycidae. It was described by Gahan in 1890.
