= Dotoramades difformipes =

Scientific classification
- Domain: Eukaryota
- Kingdom: Animalia
- Phylum: Arthropoda
- Class: Insecta
- Order: Coleoptera
- Suborder: Polyphaga
- Infraorder: Cucujiformia
- Family: Cerambycidae
- Genus: Dotoramades
- Species: D. difformipes

Binomial name
- Dotoramades difformipes Bates, 1879

Species of beetle

Dotoramades difformipes is a species of beetle in the family Cerambycidae. It was described by Bates in 1879.
