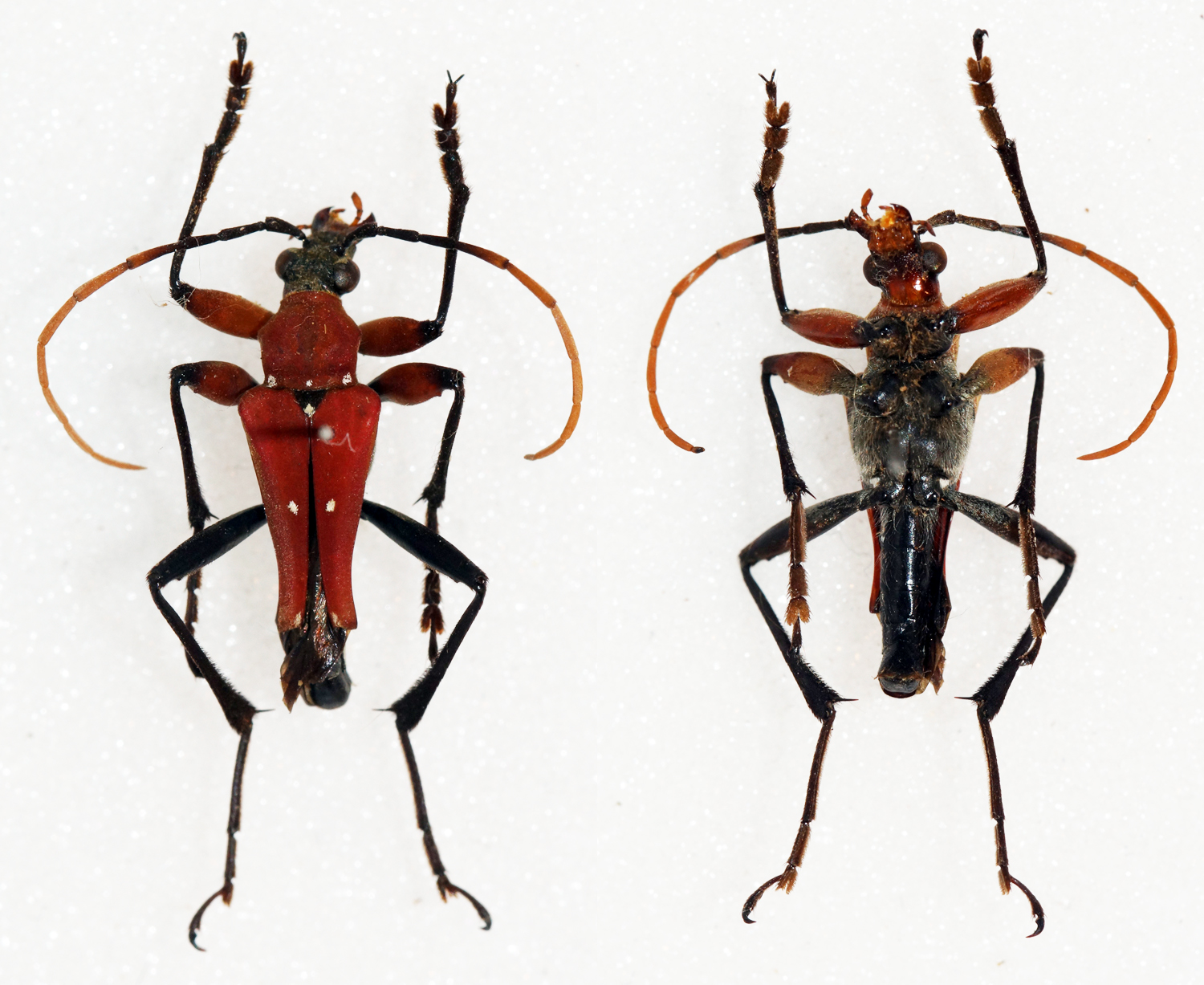

Scientific classification
- Kingdom: Animalia
- Phylum: Arthropoda
- Class: Insecta
- Order: Coleoptera
- Suborder: Polyphaga
- Infraorder: Cucujiformia
- Family: Cerambycidae
- Genus: Stenoxotus
- Species: S. ochreoruber

Binomial name
- Stenoxotus ochreoruber Fairmaire, 1896

= Stenoxotus ochreoruber =

Species of beetle

Stenoxotus ochreoruber is a species of beetle in the family Cerambycidae. It was described by Fairmaire in 1896.

It is mainly found in Madagascar.
