= Appedesis =

Scientific classification
- Domain: Eukaryota
- Kingdom: Animalia
- Phylum: Arthropoda
- Class: Insecta
- Order: Coleoptera
- Suborder: Polyphaga
- Infraorder: Cucujiformia
- Family: Cerambycidae
- Subfamily: Apatophyseinae
- Tribe: Apatophyseini
- Genus: Appedesis; Waterhouse, 1880

Genus of beetle

Appedesis is a genus in the longhorn beetle family Cerambycidae. There are at least two described species in Appedesis, found in Madagascar.

This genus was described by English naturalist, George Robert Waterhouse, in 1880.

== Species ==
These two species belong to the genus Appedesis:

- Appedesis andringitrensis Villiers, Quentin & Vives, 2011
- Appedesis vidua Waterhouse, 1880
