= Soalalana alboscutata =

Scientific classification
- Kingdom: Animalia
- Phylum: Arthropoda
- Clade: Pancrustacea
- Class: Insecta
- Order: Coleoptera
- Suborder: Polyphaga
- Infraorder: Cucujiformia
- Family: Cerambycidae
- Subfamily: Apatophyseinae
- Tribe: Apatophyseini
- Genus: Stenotsivoka
- Species: S. remipes

Binomial name
- Stenotsivoka remipes (Fairmaire, 1902)

Synonyms
- Artelida remipes Corinta-Ferreira & Veiga-Ferreira, 1959; Stenotsivoka latipes Adlbauer, 2001

Species of beetle

Stenotsivoka remipes is a species in the longhorn beetle family Cerambycidae. It is found in Madagascar.
