= Bejofoana =

Scientific classification
- Kingdom: Animalia
- Phylum: Arthropoda
- Class: Insecta
- Order: Coleoptera
- Suborder: Polyphaga
- Infraorder: Cucujiformia
- Family: Cerambycidae
- Subfamily: Apatophyseinae
- Tribe: Apatophyseini
- Genus: Bejofoana; Villiers, Quentin & Vives, 2011
- Species: B. salvazai

Binomial name
- Bejofoana salvazai Villiers, Quentin & Vives, 2011

Genus of beetles

Bejofoana is a genus in the longhorn beetle family Cerambycidae. This genus has a single species, Bejofoana salvazai. It is found in Madagascar.
