= Icariotis fulvicornis =

Scientific classification
- Kingdom: Animalia
- Phylum: Arthropoda
- Class: Insecta
- Order: Coleoptera
- Suborder: Polyphaga
- Infraorder: Cucujiformia
- Family: Cerambycidae
- Genus: Icariotis
- Species: I. fulvicornis

Binomial name
- Icariotis fulvicornis Pascoe, 1888

Species of beetle

Icariotis fulvicornis is a species of beetle in the family Cerambycidae. It was described by Pascoe in 1888.
