= Hukaruana =

Scientific classification
- Kingdom: Animalia
- Phylum: Arthropoda
- Class: Insecta
- Order: Coleoptera
- Suborder: Polyphaga
- Infraorder: Cucujiformia
- Family: Cerambycidae
- Subfamily: Apatophyseinae
- Tribe: Apatophyseini
- Genus: Hukaruana; Villiers, Quentin & Vives, 2011
- Species: H. brachyptera

Binomial name
- Hukaruana brachyptera (Fairmaire, 1901)

Synonyms
- Myiodola brachyptera Fairmaire, 1901

Genus of beetles

Hukaruana is a genus in the longhorn beetle family Cerambycidae. This genus has a single species, Hukaruana brachyptera. It is native to Madagascar.
