= Brachymyiodola =

Scientific classification
- Kingdom: Animalia
- Phylum: Arthropoda
- Class: Insecta
- Order: Coleoptera
- Suborder: Polyphaga
- Infraorder: Cucujiformia
- Family: Cerambycidae
- Subfamily: Apatophyseinae
- Tribe: Apatophyseini
- Genus: Brachymyiodola; Villiers, Quentin & Vives, 2011
- Species: B. maculosa

Binomial name
- Brachymyiodola maculosa (Fairmaire, 1901)

Synonyms
- Myiodola maculosa Fairmaire, 1901

Genus of beetles

Brachymyiodola is a genus in the longhorn beetle family Cerambycidae. This genus has a single species, Brachymyiodola maculosa. It is native to Madagascar. It was described under the basionym Myiodola maculosa by Léon Fairmaire in 1901.
