= Musius =

Scientific classification
- Kingdom: Animalia
- Phylum: Arthropoda
- Class: Insecta
- Order: Coleoptera
- Suborder: Polyphaga
- Infraorder: Cucujiformia
- Family: Cerambycidae
- Subfamily: Apatophyseinae
- Tribe: Apatophyseini
- Genus: Musius; Fairmaire, 1889

Genus of beetles

Musius is a genus in the longhorn beetle family Cerambycidae. There are at least three described species in Musius, found in Madagascar.

== Species ==
These three species belong to the genus Musius:

- Musius crassicornis Boppe, 1921
- Musius flavimembris Boppe, 1921
- Musius quadrinodosus Fairmaire, 1889
