= Antigenes funebris =

Scientific classification
- Domain: Eukaryota
- Kingdom: Animalia
- Phylum: Arthropoda
- Class: Insecta
- Order: Coleoptera
- Suborder: Polyphaga
- Infraorder: Cucujiformia
- Family: Cerambycidae
- Tribe: Apatophyseini
- Genus: Antigenes; Pascoe, 1888
- Species: A. funebris

Binomial name
- Antigenes funebris Pascoe, 1888

Genus of beetles

Antigenes is a genus in the longhorn beetle family Cerambycidae. This genus has a single species, Antigenes funebris. It is found in Madagascar.
