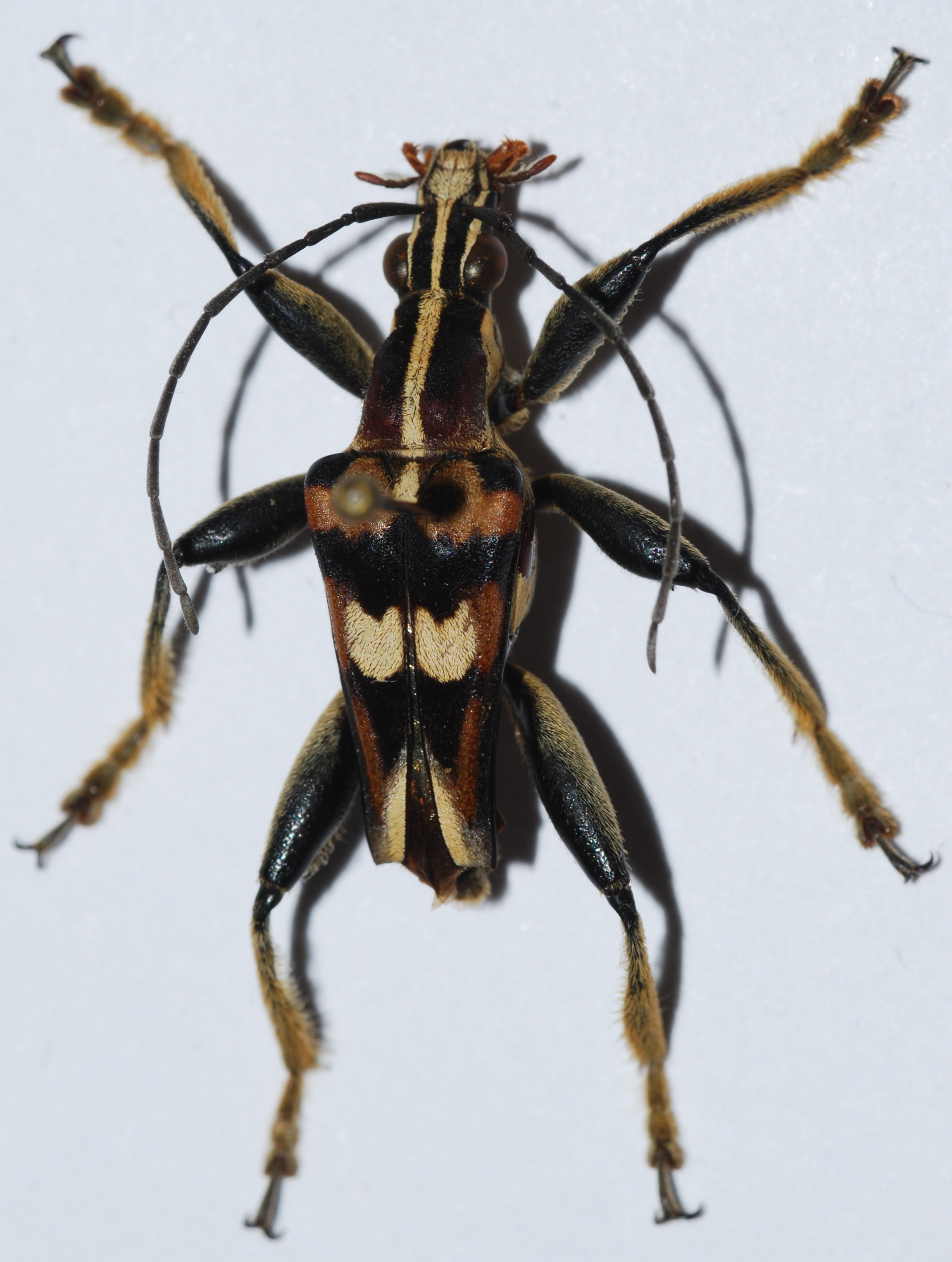

Scientific classification
- Kingdom: Animalia
- Phylum: Arthropoda
- Clade: Pancrustacea
- Class: Insecta
- Order: Coleoptera
- Suborder: Polyphaga
- Infraorder: Cucujiformia
- Family: Cerambycidae
- Genus: Anthribola
- Species: A. decoratus

Binomial name
- Anthribola decoratus Bates, 1879

= Anthribola decoratus =

Species of beetle

Anthribola decoratus is a species of beetle in the family Cerambycidae. It was described by Bates in 1879.
