= Villiersicus longicornis =

Scientific classification
- Domain: Eukaryota
- Kingdom: Animalia
- Phylum: Arthropoda
- Class: Insecta
- Order: Coleoptera
- Suborder: Polyphaga
- Infraorder: Cucujiformia
- Family: Cerambycidae
- Genus: Villiersicus
- Species: V. longicornis

Binomial name
- Villiersicus longicornis Vives, 2005

Species of beetle

Villiersicus longicornis is a species of beetle in the family Cerambycidae. It was described by Vives in 2005.
