= Logisticus villiersi =

Scientific classification
- Domain: Eukaryota
- Kingdom: Animalia
- Phylum: Arthropoda
- Class: Insecta
- Order: Coleoptera
- Suborder: Polyphaga
- Infraorder: Cucujiformia
- Family: Cerambycidae
- Genus: Logisticus
- Species: L. villiersi

Binomial name
- Logisticus villiersi Vives, 2004

Species of beetle

Logisticus villiersi is a species of beetle in the family Cerambycidae. It was described by Vives in 2004.
