= Aedoeus anjouanensis =

Scientific classification
- Kingdom: Animalia
- Phylum: Arthropoda
- Class: Insecta
- Order: Coleoptera
- Suborder: Polyphaga
- Infraorder: Cucujiformia
- Family: Cerambycidae
- Genus: Aedoeus
- Species: A. anjouanensis

Binomial name
- Aedoeus anjouanensis Quentin & Villiers, 1979

Species of beetle

Aedoeus anjouanensis is a species of beetle in the family Cerambycidae. It was described by Quentin and Villiers in 1979.
