= Icariotis scapularis =

Scientific classification
- Kingdom: Animalia
- Phylum: Arthropoda
- Class: Insecta
- Order: Coleoptera
- Suborder: Polyphaga
- Infraorder: Cucujiformia
- Family: Cerambycidae
- Genus: Icariotis
- Species: I. scapularis

Binomial name
- Icariotis scapularis Pascoe, 1888

Species of beetle

Icariotis scapularis is a species of beetle in the family Cerambycidae. It was described by Pascoe in 1888.
