= Paralogisticus drumonti =

Scientific classification
- Domain: Eukaryota
- Kingdom: Animalia
- Phylum: Arthropoda
- Class: Insecta
- Order: Coleoptera
- Suborder: Polyphaga
- Infraorder: Cucujiformia
- Family: Cerambycidae
- Genus: Paralogisticus
- Species: P. drumonti

Binomial name
- Paralogisticus drumonti Vives, 2006

Species of beetle

Paralogisticus drumonti is a species of beetle in the family Cerambycidae. It was described by Vives in 2006.
