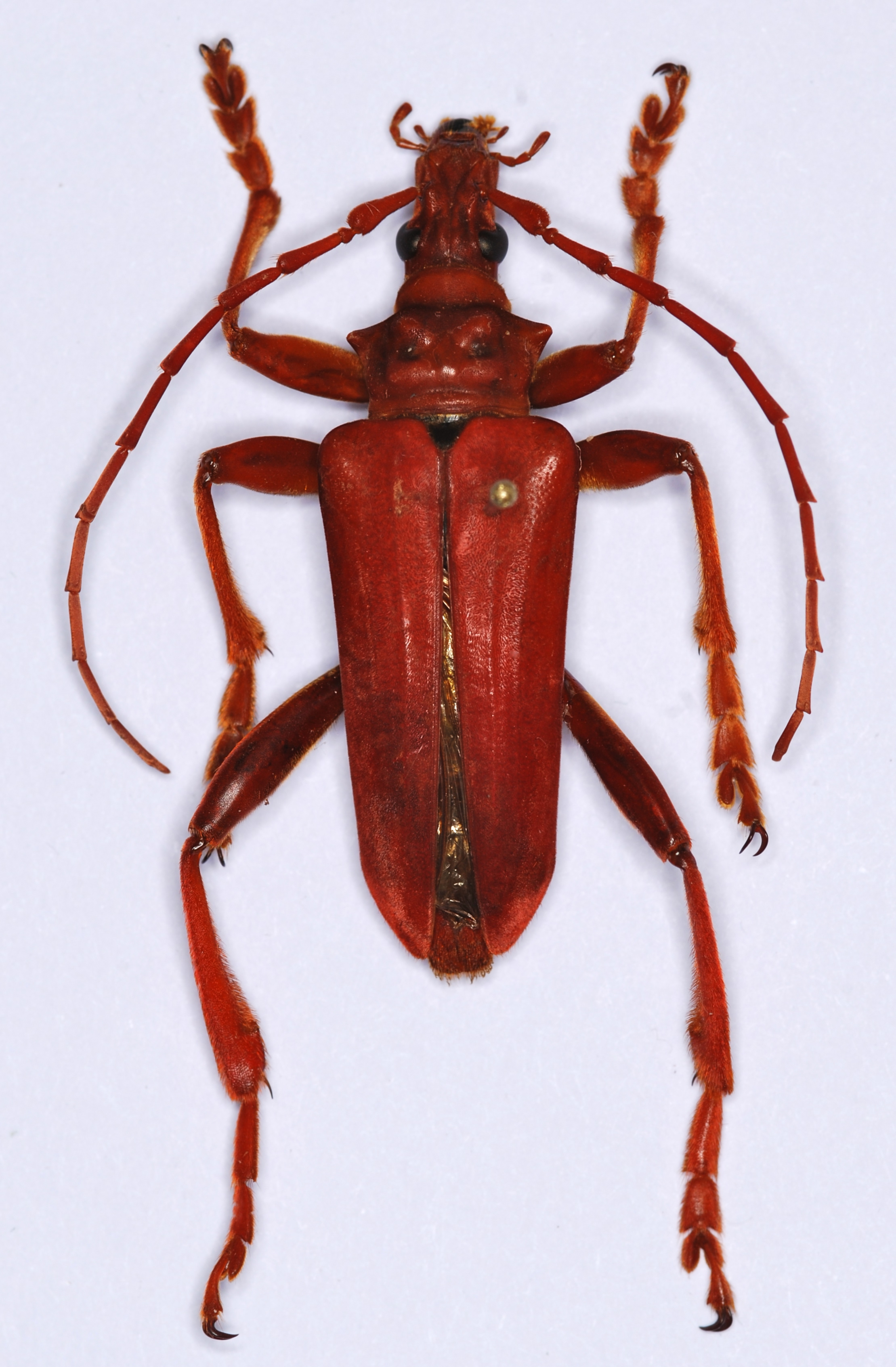
- Suzelia coccinea, Madagascar

Scientific classification
- Kingdom: Animalia
- Phylum: Arthropoda
- Class: Insecta
- Order: Coleoptera
- Suborder: Polyphaga
- Infraorder: Cucujiformia
- Family: Cerambycidae
- Subfamily: Apatophyseinae
- Tribe: Apatophyseini
- Genus: Suzelia; Villiers, 1982
- Species: S. coccinea

Binomial name
- Suzelia coccinea (Bates, 1879)

= Suzelia =

Genus of beetles

Suzelia is a genus of long-horned beetles in the family Cerambycidae. This genus has a single species, Suzelia coccinea, found in Madagascar.
