= Sagridola armiventris =

Scientific classification
- Kingdom: Animalia
- Phylum: Arthropoda
- Class: Insecta
- Order: Coleoptera
- Suborder: Polyphaga
- Infraorder: Cucujiformia
- Family: Cerambycidae
- Genus: Sagridola
- Species: S. armiventris

Binomial name
- Sagridola armiventris Fairmaire, 1903

Species of beetle

Sagridola armiventris is a species of beetle in the family Cerambycidae. It was described by Fairmaire in 1903.
