= Barossus =

Scientific classification
- Domain: Eukaryota
- Kingdom: Animalia
- Phylum: Arthropoda
- Class: Insecta
- Order: Coleoptera
- Suborder: Polyphaga
- Infraorder: Cucujiformia
- Family: Cerambycidae
- Subfamily: Apatophyseinae
- Tribe: Apatophyseini
- Genus: Barossus; Fairmaire, 1893

Genus of beetles

Barossus is a genus in the longhorn beetle family Cerambycidae described by Fairmaire in 1893. There are at least two described species in Barossus, found in Madagascar.

== Species ==
These two species belong to the genus Barossus:

- Barossus cineraceus Fairmaire, 1893
- Barossus kauppi (Adlbauer, 2001)
