= Lepturasta =

Scientific classification
- Kingdom: Animalia
- Phylum: Arthropoda
- Class: Insecta
- Order: Coleoptera
- Suborder: Polyphaga
- Infraorder: Cucujiformia
- Family: Cerambycidae
- Tribe: Apatophyseini
- Genus: Lepturasta; Fairmaire, 1901
- Species: L. russa

Binomial name
- Lepturasta russa Fairmaire, 1901

Genus of beetles

Lepturasta is a genus in the longhorn beetle family Cerambycidae. This genus has a single species, Lepturasta russa. It is found in Madagascar.
