= Xanthopiodus hiekei =

Scientific classification
- Domain: Eukaryota
- Kingdom: Animalia
- Phylum: Arthropoda
- Class: Insecta
- Order: Coleoptera
- Suborder: Polyphaga
- Infraorder: Cucujiformia
- Family: Cerambycidae
- Genus: Xanthopiodus
- Species: X. hiekei

Binomial name
- Xanthopiodus hiekei Vives, 2001

Species of beetle

Xanthopiodus hiekei is a species of beetle in the family Cerambycidae. It was described by Vives in 2001.
