= Xanthopiodus =

Scientific classification
- Kingdom: Animalia
- Phylum: Arthropoda
- Class: Insecta
- Order: Coleoptera
- Suborder: Polyphaga
- Infraorder: Cucujiformia
- Family: Cerambycidae
- Subfamily: Apatophyseinae
- Tribe: Apatophyseini
- Genus: Xanthopiodus; Fairmaire, 1897

Genus of beetles in the family Cerambycidae

Xanthopiodus is a genus in the longhorn beetle family Cerambycidae. There are at least three described species in Xanthopiodus, found in Madagascar.

== Species ==
These three species belong to the genus Xanthopiodus:

- Xanthopiodus angulicollis Fairmaire, 1897
- Xanthopiodus hiekei Vives, 2001
- Xanthopiodus oculatus Villiers, Quentin & Vives, 2011
