= Planisticus nivosus =

Scientific classification
- Kingdom: Animalia
- Phylum: Arthropoda
- Class: Insecta
- Order: Coleoptera
- Suborder: Polyphaga
- Infraorder: Cucujiformia
- Family: Cerambycidae
- Genus: Planisticus
- Species: P. nivosus

Binomial name
- Planisticus nivosus (Fairmaire, 1893)

Species of beetle

Planisticus nivosus is a species of beetle in the family Cerambycidae. It was described by Fairmaire in 1893.
