= Logisticus obtusipennis =

Scientific classification
- Kingdom: Animalia
- Phylum: Arthropoda
- Class: Insecta
- Order: Coleoptera
- Suborder: Polyphaga
- Infraorder: Cucujiformia
- Family: Cerambycidae
- Genus: Logisticus
- Species: L. obtusipennis

Binomial name
- Logisticus obtusipennis Fairmaire, 1901

Species of beetle

Logisticus obtusipennis is a species of beetle in the family Cerambycidae. It was described by Fairmaire in 1901.
