= Icariotis subsulcata =

Scientific classification
- Kingdom: Animalia
- Phylum: Arthropoda
- Class: Insecta
- Order: Coleoptera
- Suborder: Polyphaga
- Infraorder: Cucujiformia
- Family: Cerambycidae
- Genus: Icariotis
- Species: I. subsulcata

Binomial name
- Icariotis subsulcata Fairmaire, 1893

Species of beetle

Icariotis subsulcata is a species of beetle in the family Cerambycidae. It was described by Fairmaire in 1893.
