= Paralogisticus =

Scientific classification
- Domain: Eukaryota
- Kingdom: Animalia
- Phylum: Arthropoda
- Class: Insecta
- Order: Coleoptera
- Suborder: Polyphaga
- Infraorder: Cucujiformia
- Family: Cerambycidae
- Subfamily: Apatophyseinae
- Tribe: Apatophyseini
- Genus: Paralogisticus; Vives, 2006

Genus of beetles

Paralogisticus is a genus in the longhorn beetle family Cerambycidae. There are at least two described species in Paralogisticus, found in Madagascar.

== Species ==
These two species belong to the genus Paralogisticus:

- Paralogisticus drumonti Vives, 2006
- Paralogisticus pauliani Vives, 2006
