= Tsivoka peyrierasi =

Scientific classification
- Domain: Eukaryota
- Kingdom: Animalia
- Phylum: Arthropoda
- Class: Insecta
- Order: Coleoptera
- Suborder: Polyphaga
- Infraorder: Cucujiformia
- Family: Cerambycidae
- Genus: Tsivoka
- Species: T. peyrierasi

Binomial name
- Tsivoka peyrierasi Villiers, 1982

Species of insect

Tsivoka peyrierasi is a species of beetle in the family Cerambycidae. It was described by Villiers in 1982.
