= Trichroa =

Scientific classification
- Kingdom: Animalia
- Phylum: Arthropoda
- Class: Insecta
- Order: Coleoptera
- Suborder: Polyphaga
- Infraorder: Cucujiformia
- Family: Cerambycidae
- Subfamily: Apatophyseinae
- Tribe: Apatophyseini
- Genus: Trichroa; Fairmaire, 1894
- Species: T. oberthueri

Binomial name
- Trichroa oberthueri (Fairmaire, 1892)

Synonyms
- Trichromia Fairmaire, 1892

Genus of beetles

Trichroa is a genus of longhorned beetles in the family Cerambycidae. This genus has a single species, Trichroa oberthueri, found in Madagascar.
