= Sitiorica =

Scientific classification
- Kingdom: Animalia
- Phylum: Arthropoda
- Class: Insecta
- Order: Coleoptera
- Suborder: Polyphaga
- Infraorder: Cucujiformia
- Family: Cerambycidae
- Subfamily: Apatophyseinae
- Tribe: Apatophyseini
- Genus: Sitiorica; Villiers, Quentin & Vives, 2011
- Species: S. tenuipes

Binomial name
- Sitiorica tenuipes (Fairmaire, 1901)

Genus of beetles

Sitiorica is a genus in the longhorn beetle family Cerambycidae. This genus has a single species, Sitiorica tenuipes. It is found in Madagascar.
