= Tomobrachyta jenisi =

Scientific classification
- Domain: Eukaryota
- Kingdom: Animalia
- Phylum: Arthropoda
- Class: Insecta
- Order: Coleoptera
- Suborder: Polyphaga
- Infraorder: Cucujiformia
- Family: Cerambycidae
- Genus: Tomobrachyta
- Species: T. jenisi

Binomial name
- Tomobrachyta jenisi Adlbauer, 2001

Species of beetle

Tomobrachyta jenisi is a species of beetle in the family Cerambycidae. It was described by Adlbauer in 2001.
