= Icariotis politicollis =

Scientific classification
- Kingdom: Animalia
- Phylum: Arthropoda
- Class: Insecta
- Order: Coleoptera
- Suborder: Polyphaga
- Infraorder: Cucujiformia
- Family: Cerambycidae
- Genus: Icariotis
- Species: I. politicollis

Binomial name
- Icariotis politicollis Fairmaire, 1905

Species of beetle

Icariotis politicollis is a species of beetle in the family Cerambycidae. It was described by Fairmaire in 1905.
