= Lepturovespa =

Scientific classification
- Kingdom: Animalia
- Phylum: Arthropoda
- Class: Insecta
- Order: Coleoptera
- Suborder: Polyphaga
- Infraorder: Cucujiformia
- Family: Cerambycidae
- Subfamily: Apatophyseinae
- Tribe: Apatophyseini
- Genus: Lepturovespa; Villiers, Quentin & Vives, 2011

Genus of beetles

Lepturovespa is a genus in the longhorn beetle family Cerambycidae. There are at least three described species in Lepturovespa, found in Madagascar.

== Species ==
These three species belong to the genus Lepturovespa:

- Lepturovespa aurantipes Villiers, Quentin & Vives, 2011
- Lepturovespa calceata (Fairmaire, 1901)
- Lepturovespa stricticollis Villiers, Quentin & Vives, 2011
