= Dysmathosoma lucidus =

Scientific classification
- Kingdom: Animalia
- Phylum: Arthropoda
- Class: Insecta
- Order: Coleoptera
- Suborder: Polyphaga
- Infraorder: Cucujiformia
- Family: Cerambycidae
- Genus: Dysmathosoma
- Species: D. lucidus

Binomial name
- Dysmathosoma lucidus Vives, 2004

Species of beetle

Dysmathosoma lucidus is a species of beetle in the family Cerambycidae. It was described by Vives in 2004.
