= Enthymius =

Scientific classification
- Domain: Eukaryota
- Kingdom: Animalia
- Phylum: Arthropoda
- Class: Insecta
- Order: Coleoptera
- Suborder: Polyphaga
- Infraorder: Cucujiformia
- Family: Cerambycidae
- Subfamily: Apatophyseinae
- Tribe: Apatophyseini
- Genus: Enthymius; Waterhouse, 1878

Genus of beetles

Enthymius is a genus in the longhorn beetle family Cerambycidae. There are at least three described species in Enthymius, found in Madagascar.

== Species ==
These three species belong to the genus Enthymius:

- Enthymius dubius Waterhouse, 1878
- Enthymius farinosus (Fairmaire, 1902)
- Enthymius pachydermus (Fairmaire, 1893)
