= Heteraedoeus =

Scientific classification
- Kingdom: Animalia
- Phylum: Arthropoda
- Class: Insecta
- Order: Coleoptera
- Suborder: Polyphaga
- Infraorder: Cucujiformia
- Family: Cerambycidae
- Subfamily: Apatophyseinae
- Tribe: Apatophyseini
- Genus: Heteraedoeus; Villiers, Quentin & Vives, 2011
- Species: H. pallidocinctus

Binomial name
- Heteraedoeus pallidocinctus (Fairmaire, 1896)

Synonyms
- Icariotis pallidocinctus Fairmaire, 1896; Aedeus marginatus Fairmaire, 1903; Aedoeus marginatus (Fairmaire, 1903)

Genus of beetles

Heteraedoeus is a genus in the longhorn beetle family Cerambycidae. This genus has a single species, Heteraedoeus pallidocinctus. It is found in Madagascar.
