= Tomobrachyta =

Scientific classification
- Kingdom: Animalia
- Phylum: Arthropoda
- Class: Insecta
- Order: Coleoptera
- Suborder: Polyphaga
- Infraorder: Cucujiformia
- Family: Cerambycidae
- Subfamily: Apatophyseinae
- Tribe: Apatophyseini
- Genus: Tomobrachyta; Fairmaire, 1887

Genus of beetles

Tomobrachyta is a genus in the longhorn beetle family Cerambycidae. There are at least two described species in Tomobrachyta, found in Madagascar.

== Species ==
These two species belong to the genus Tomobrachyta:

- Tomobrachyta jenisi Adlbauer, 2001
- Tomobrachyta nigroplagiata Fairmaire, 1887
