= Planisticus breuningi =

Scientific classification
- Domain: Eukaryota
- Kingdom: Animalia
- Phylum: Arthropoda
- Class: Insecta
- Order: Coleoptera
- Suborder: Polyphaga
- Infraorder: Cucujiformia
- Family: Cerambycidae
- Genus: Planisticus
- Species: P. breuningi

Binomial name
- Planisticus breuningi Vives, 2004

Species of beetle

Planisticus breuningi is a species of beetle in the family Cerambycidae. It was described by Vives in 2004.
