= Protapatophysis vartianae =

Scientific classification
- Domain: Eukaryota
- Kingdom: Animalia
- Phylum: Arthropoda
- Class: Insecta
- Order: Coleoptera
- Suborder: Polyphaga
- Infraorder: Cucujiformia
- Family: Cerambycidae
- Genus: Protapatophysis
- Species: P. vartianae

Binomial name
- Protapatophysis vartianae (Heyrovský, 1971)

Synonyms
- Apatophysis vartianae (Heyrovský, 1971); Apatophysis (Protapatophysis) vartianae Heyrovský, 1971

Species of beetle

Protapatophysis vartianae is a species of beetle in the family Cerambycidae.
