= Aedoeus geniculatus =

Scientific classification
- Domain: Eukaryota
- Kingdom: Animalia
- Phylum: Arthropoda
- Class: Insecta
- Order: Coleoptera
- Suborder: Polyphaga
- Infraorder: Cucujiformia
- Family: Cerambycidae
- Genus: Aedoeus
- Species: A. geniculatus

Binomial name
- Aedoeus geniculatus Waterhouse, 1880

Species of beetle

Aedoeus geniculatus is a species of beetle in the family Cerambycidae. It was described by Waterhouse in 1880.
