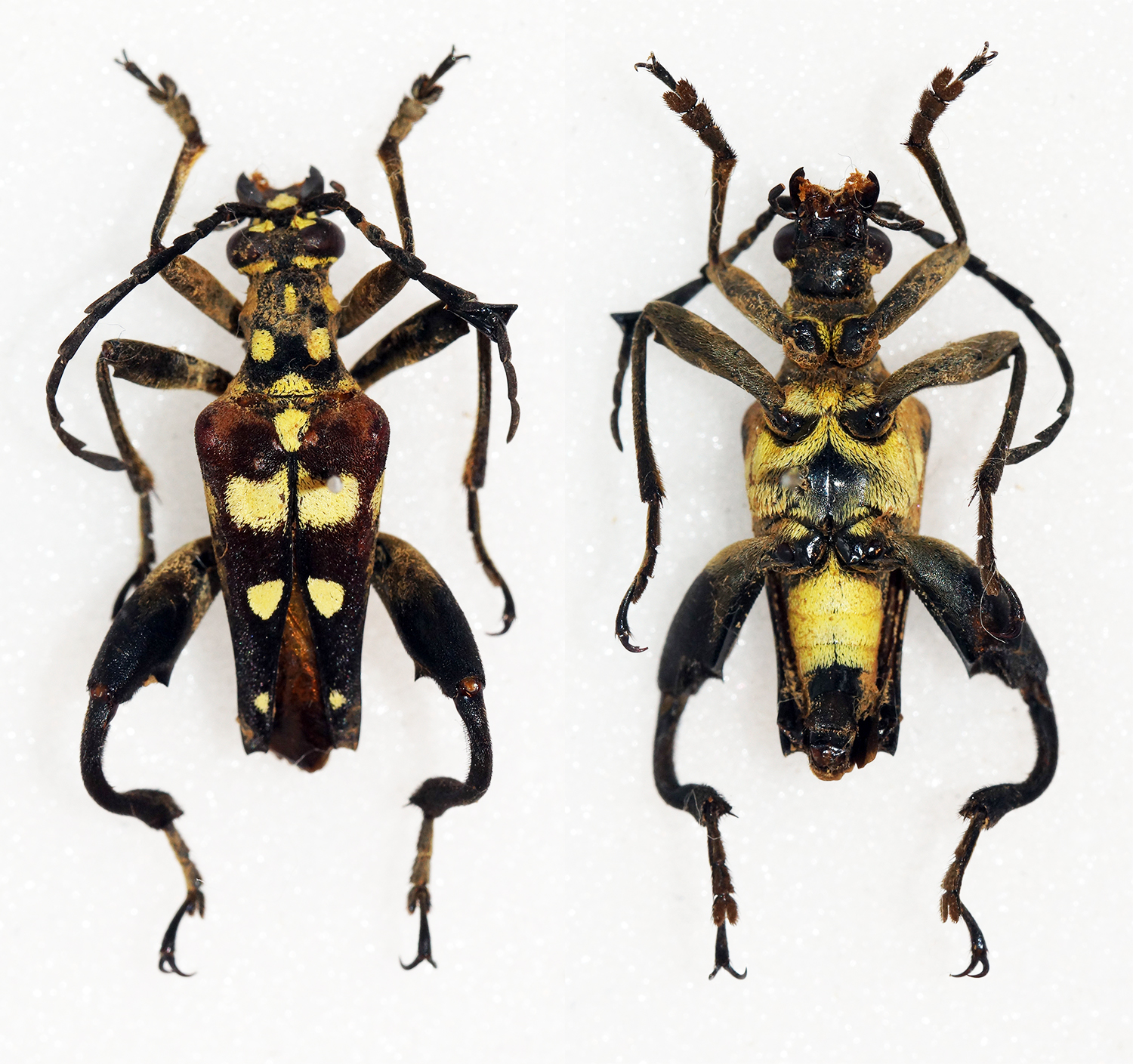
- Sagridola maculosa - Male

Scientific classification
- Domain: Eukaryota
- Kingdom: Animalia
- Phylum: Arthropoda
- Class: Insecta
- Order: Coleoptera
- Suborder: Polyphaga
- Infraorder: Cucujiformia
- Family: Cerambycidae
- Subfamily: Apatophyseinae
- Tribe: Apatophyseini
- Genus: Sagridola; Thomson, 1864

= Sagridola =

Genus of beetles

Sagridola is a genus in the longhorn beetle family Cerambycidae. There are at least four described species in Sagridola, found in Madagascar.

== Species ==
These four species belong to the genus Sagridola:

- Sagridola armiventris Fairmaire, 1903
- Sagridola hereana Villiers, Quentin & Vives, 2011
- Sagridola luteicornis Boppe, 1921
- Sagridola maculosa (Guérin-Méneville, 1844)
