= Dotoramades sambiranensis =

Scientific classification
- Kingdom: Animalia
- Phylum: Arthropoda
- Class: Insecta
- Order: Coleoptera
- Suborder: Polyphaga
- Infraorder: Cucujiformia
- Family: Cerambycidae
- Genus: Dotoramades
- Species: D. sambiranensis

Binomial name
- Dotoramades sambiranensis Villiers, 1982

Species of beetle

Dotoramades sambiranensis is a species of beetle in the family Cerambycidae. It was described by Villiers in 1982.
