= Pachysticus morosus =

Scientific classification
- Kingdom: Animalia
- Phylum: Arthropoda
- Class: Insecta
- Order: Coleoptera
- Suborder: Polyphaga
- Infraorder: Cucujiformia
- Family: Cerambycidae
- Genus: Pachysticus
- Species: P. morosus

Binomial name
- Pachysticus morosus (Fairmaire, 1894)

Species of beetle

Pachysticus morosus is a species of beetle in the family Cerambycidae. It was described by Fairmaire in 1894.
