= Cribraedoeus =

Scientific classification
- Kingdom: Animalia
- Phylum: Arthropoda
- Class: Insecta
- Order: Coleoptera
- Suborder: Polyphaga
- Infraorder: Cucujiformia
- Family: Cerambycidae
- Subfamily: Apatophyseinae
- Tribe: Apatophyseini
- Genus: Cribraedoeus; Villiers, Quentin & Vives, 2011

Genus of beetles

Cribraedoeus is a genus in the longhorn beetle family Cerambycidae. There are at least three described species in Cribraedoeus, found in Madagascar.

== Species ==
These three species belong to the genus Cribraedoeus:

- Cribraedoeus basipennis (Fairmaire, 1901)
- Cribraedoeus scapularis Villiers, Quentin & Vives, 2011
- Cribraedoeus unicolor (Fairmaire, 1901)
