= Catalanotoxotus nivosus =

Scientific classification
- Kingdom: Animalia
- Phylum: Arthropoda
- Class: Insecta
- Order: Coleoptera
- Suborder: Polyphaga
- Infraorder: Cucujiformia
- Family: Cerambycidae
- Genus: Catalanotoxotus
- Species: C. nivosus

Binomial name
- Catalanotoxotus nivosus Vives, 2005

Species of beetle

Catalanotoxotus nivosus is a species of beetle in the family Cerambycidae. It was described by Vives in 2005.
