= Apheledes stigmatipennis =

Scientific classification
- Kingdom: Animalia
- Phylum: Arthropoda
- Class: Insecta
- Order: Coleoptera
- Suborder: Polyphaga
- Infraorder: Cucujiformia
- Family: Cerambycidae
- Genus: Apheledes
- Species: A. stigmatipennis

Binomial name
- Apheledes stigmatipennis (Fairmaire, 1887)

Synonyms
- Toxotus stigmatipennis Fairmaire, 1887; Apheledes guttulatus Fairmaire, 1893; Apheledes velutinus Pascoe, 1888; Logisticus stigmatipennis (Fairmaire, 1887)

Species of beetle

Apheledes stigmatipennis is a species of beetle in the family Cerambycidae. It was described by Fairmaire in 1887.
