= Ariastes muellerae =

Scientific classification
- Kingdom: Animalia
- Phylum: Arthropoda
- Class: Insecta
- Order: Coleoptera
- Suborder: Polyphaga
- Infraorder: Cucujiformia
- Family: Cerambycidae
- Genus: Ariastes
- Species: A. muellerae

Binomial name
- Ariastes muellerae Vives, 2003

Species of beetle

Ariastes muellerae is a species of beetle in the family Cerambycidae. It was described by Vives in 2003.

== Characteristics ==
Ariastes muellerae range in length from 4-6 millimetres. The body is black in colour, with brown mandibles and antennae. The head is small relative to the rest of the body, and the exoskeleton is smooth in texture. It has long slender legs covered with fine hair that is gold in colour.
