= Artelida aurosericea =

Scientific classification
- Domain: Eukaryota
- Kingdom: Animalia
- Phylum: Arthropoda
- Class: Insecta
- Order: Coleoptera
- Suborder: Polyphaga
- Infraorder: Cucujiformia
- Family: Cerambycidae
- Genus: Artelida
- Species: A. aurosericea

Binomial name
- Artelida aurosericea Waterhouse, 1882

Species of beetle

Artelida aurosericea is a species of beetle in the family Cerambycidae. It was described by Waterhouse in 1882.
