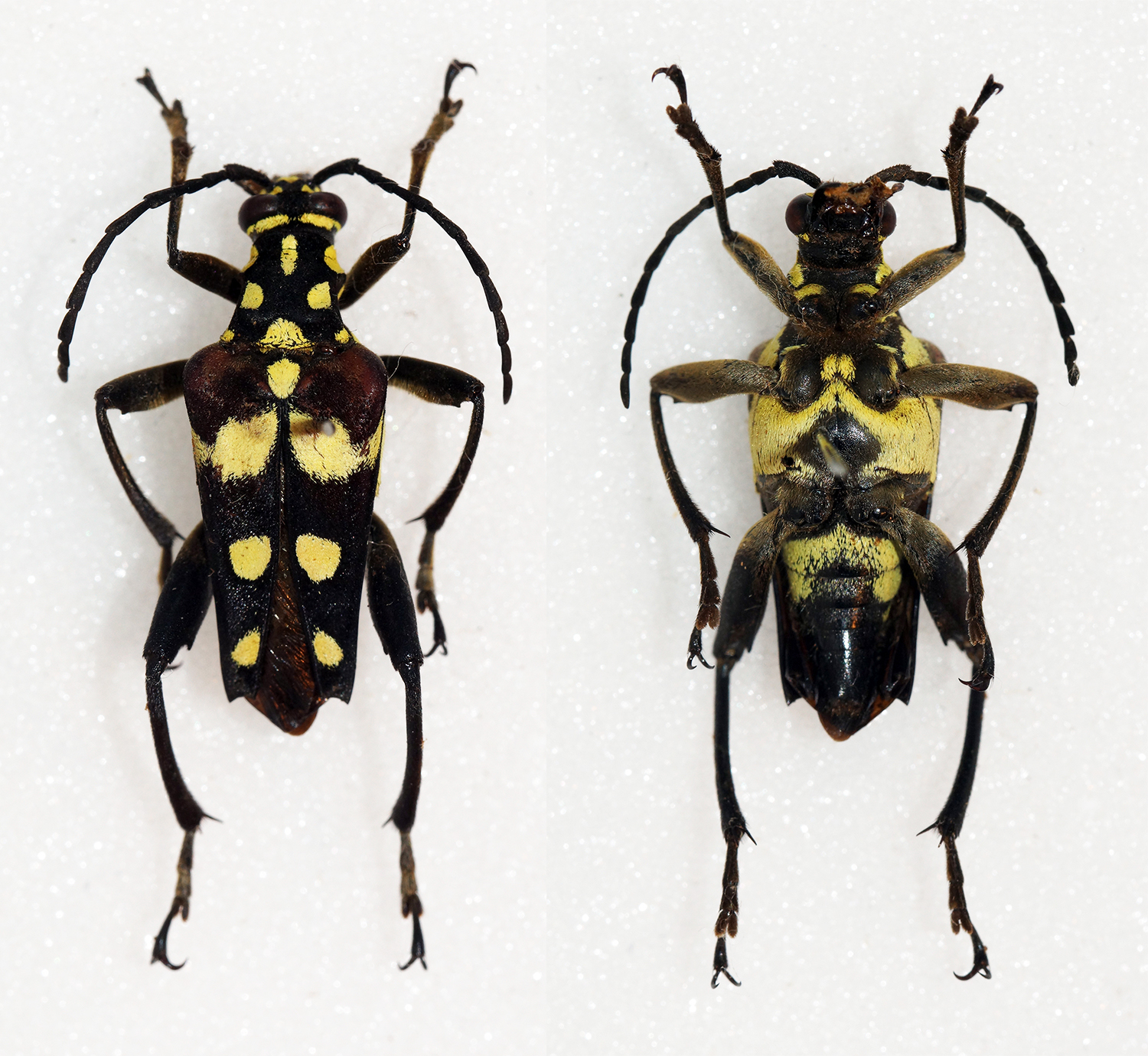

Scientific classification
- Kingdom: Animalia
- Phylum: Arthropoda
- Clade: Pancrustacea
- Class: Insecta
- Order: Coleoptera
- Suborder: Polyphaga
- Infraorder: Cucujiformia
- Family: Cerambycidae
- Genus: Sagridola
- Species: S. maculosa

Binomial name
- Sagridola maculosa (Guérin-Méneville, 1844)

Synonyms
- Artelida nobilitata Alluaud, 1900; Leptura nobilitata Nonfried, 1892; Sagridola maculata Thomson, 1878; Toxotus maculosus Guérin-Méneville, 1844

= Sagridola maculosa =

Species of beetle

Sagridola maculosa is a species in the longhorn beetle family Cerambycidae. It is found in Madagascar.
