= Dotoramades =

Scientific classification
- Kingdom: Animalia
- Phylum: Arthropoda
- Class: Insecta
- Order: Coleoptera
- Suborder: Polyphaga
- Infraorder: Cucujiformia
- Family: Cerambycidae
- Subfamily: Apatophyseinae
- Tribe: Apatophyseini
- Genus: Dotoramades; Villiers, 1982

Genus of beetles

Dotoramades is a genus in the longhorn beetle family Cerambycidae. There are about five described species in Dotoramades, found in Madagascar.

== Species ==
These five species belong to the genus Dotoramades:

- Dotoramades basalis Villiers, 1982
- Dotoramades difformipes (Bates, 1879)
- Dotoramades masoalensis Villiers, 1982
- Dotoramades sambiranensis Villiers, 1982
- Dotoramades suturalis Villiers, 1982
