= Criocerinus =

Scientific classification
- Kingdom: Animalia
- Phylum: Arthropoda
- Class: Insecta
- Order: Coleoptera
- Suborder: Polyphaga
- Infraorder: Cucujiformia
- Family: Cerambycidae
- Subfamily: Apatophyseinae
- Tribe: Apatophyseini
- Genus: Criocerinus; Fairmaire, 1894

Genus of beetle

Criocerinus is a genus in the longhorn beetle family Cerambycidae. There are at least two described species in Criocerinus, found in Madagascar.

== Species ==
These two species belong to the genus Criocerinus:

- Criocerinus alluaudi Villiers, Quentin & Vives, 2011
- Criocerinus corallinus Fairmaire, 1894
