= Zulphis =

Scientific classification
- Kingdom: Animalia
- Phylum: Arthropoda
- Class: Insecta
- Order: Coleoptera
- Suborder: Polyphaga
- Infraorder: Cucujiformia
- Family: Cerambycidae
- Tribe: Apatophyseini
- Genus: Zulphis; Fairmaire, 1893
- Species: Z. subfasciata

Binomial name
- Zulphis subfasciata Fairmaire, 1893

Genus of beetles

Zulphis is a genus in the longhorn beetle family Cerambycidae. This genus has a single species, Zulphis subfasciata, found in Madagascar.
