= Phitryonus =

Scientific classification
- Kingdom: Animalia
- Phylum: Arthropoda
- Class: Insecta
- Order: Coleoptera
- Suborder: Polyphaga
- Infraorder: Cucujiformia
- Family: Cerambycidae
- Subfamily: Apatophyseinae
- Tribe: Apatophyseini
- Genus: Phitryonus; Fairmaire, 1903

Genus of beetles

Phitryonus is a genus in the longhorn beetle family Cerambycidae. There are at least two described species in Phitryonus, found in Madagascar.

== Species ==
These two species belong to the genus Phitryonus:

- Phitryonus cyanipennis Fairmaire, 1903
- Phitryonus luteicornis Villiers, Quentin & Vives, 2011
