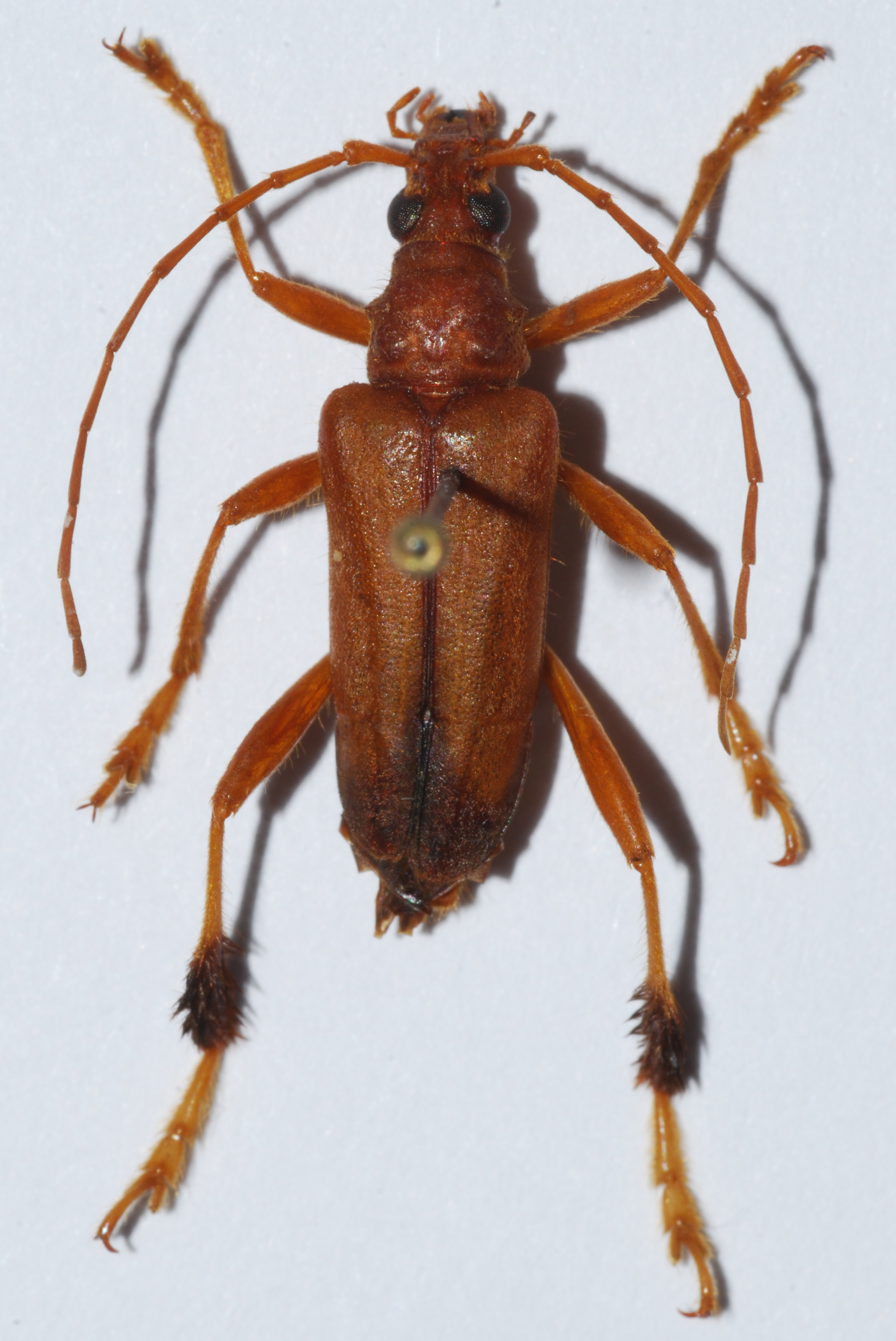

Scientific classification
- Kingdom: Animalia
- Phylum: Arthropoda
- Clade: Pancrustacea
- Class: Insecta
- Order: Coleoptera
- Suborder: Polyphaga
- Infraorder: Cucujiformia
- Family: Cerambycidae
- Genus: Artelida
- Species: A. crinipes

Binomial name
- Artelida crinipes Thomson, 1864

Synonyms
- Artelida crinita (Thomson) Waterhouse, 1882 (misspelling)

= Artelida crinipes =

Species of beetle

Artelida crinipes is the species in the long-horned beetle family (Cerambycidae). This beetle is distributed on the island of Madagascar.
