= Tomobrachyta nigroplagiata =

Scientific classification
- Kingdom: Animalia
- Phylum: Arthropoda
- Class: Insecta
- Order: Coleoptera
- Suborder: Polyphaga
- Infraorder: Cucujiformia
- Family: Cerambycidae
- Genus: Tomobrachyta
- Species: T. nigroplagiata

Binomial name
- Tomobrachyta nigroplagiata Fairmaire, 1887

Species of beetle

Tomobrachyta nigroplagiata is a species of beetle in the family Cerambycidae. It was described by Fairmaire in 1887.
