= Scopanta =

Scientific classification
- Kingdom: Animalia
- Phylum: Arthropoda
- Class: Insecta
- Order: Coleoptera
- Suborder: Polyphaga
- Infraorder: Cucujiformia
- Family: Cerambycidae
- Subfamily: Apatophyseinae
- Tribe: Apatophyseini
- Genus: Scopanta; Fairmaire, 1893

Genus of beetles

Scopanta is a genus in the longhorn beetle family Cerambycidae. There are at least three described species in Scopanta, found in Madagascar.

== Species ==
These three species belong to the genus Scopanta:

- Scopanta expansitarsis Fairmaire, 1896
- Scopanta plicicollis (Fairmaire, 1901)
- Scopanta rufula Fairmaire, 1893
