= Logisticus fuscopunctatus =

Scientific classification
- Kingdom: Animalia
- Phylum: Arthropoda
- Class: Insecta
- Order: Coleoptera
- Suborder: Polyphaga
- Infraorder: Cucujiformia
- Family: Cerambycidae
- Genus: Logisticus
- Species: L. fuscopunctatus

Binomial name
- Logisticus fuscopunctatus Fairmaire, 1903

Species of beetle

Logisticus fuscopunctatus is a species of beetle in the family Cerambycidae. It was described by Fairmaire in 1903.
