= Dysmathosoma picipes =

Scientific classification
- Kingdom: Animalia
- Phylum: Arthropoda
- Class: Insecta
- Order: Coleoptera
- Suborder: Polyphaga
- Infraorder: Cucujiformia
- Family: Cerambycidae
- Genus: Dysmathosoma
- Species: D. picipes

Binomial name
- Dysmathosoma picipes Waterhouse, 1882

Species of beetle

Dysmathosoma picipes is a species of beetle in the family Cerambycidae. It was described by Waterhouse in 1882.
