= Protapatophysis =

Scientific classification
- Domain: Eukaryota
- Kingdom: Animalia
- Phylum: Arthropoda
- Class: Insecta
- Order: Coleoptera
- Suborder: Polyphaga
- Infraorder: Cucujiformia
- Family: Cerambycidae
- Subfamily: Apatophyseinae
- Tribe: Apatophyseini
- Genus: Protapatophysis; Semenov & Schegoleva-Barovskaya, 1936

Genus of beetle

Protapatophysis is a genus in the longhorn beetle family Cerambycidae. There are about five described species in Protapatophysis, found in Asia.

== Species ==
These five species belong to the genus Protapatophysis:

- Protapatophysis hindukushensis Miroshnikov, 2020 (Pakistan)
- Protapatophysis kabakovi Danilevsky, 2011 (Afghanistan)
- Protapatophysis kashmiriana (Semenov, 1901) (India and China)
- Protapatophysis montana (Gahan, 1906) (Pakistan)
- Protapatophysis vartianae (Heyrovský, 1971) (India and Pakistan)
