= Protapatophysis kashmiriana =

Scientific classification
- Domain: Eukaryota
- Kingdom: Animalia
- Phylum: Arthropoda
- Class: Insecta
- Order: Coleoptera
- Suborder: Polyphaga
- Infraorder: Cucujiformia
- Family: Cerambycidae
- Genus: Protapatophysis
- Species: P. kashmiriana

Binomial name
- Protapatophysis kashmiriana (Semenov, 1901)

Synonyms
- Apatophysis kashmiriana Semenov, 1901; Apatophysis (Protapatophysis) kashmiriana Semenov, 1901; Centrodera (Apatophysis) kashmiriana (Semenov, 1901)

Species of beetle

Protapatophysis kashmiriana is a species of beetle in the family Cerambycidae.
