= Ariastes monostigma =

Scientific classification
- Kingdom: Animalia
- Phylum: Arthropoda
- Class: Insecta
- Order: Coleoptera
- Suborder: Polyphaga
- Infraorder: Cucujiformia
- Family: Cerambycidae
- Genus: Ariastes
- Species: A. monostigma

Binomial name
- Ariastes monostigma Fairmaire, 1896

Species of beetle

Ariastes monostigma is a species of beetle in the family Cerambycidae. It was described by Fairmaire in 1896.
