= Megasticus =

Scientific classification
- Kingdom: Animalia
- Phylum: Arthropoda
- Class: Insecta
- Order: Coleoptera
- Suborder: Polyphaga
- Infraorder: Cucujiformia
- Family: Cerambycidae
- Tribe: Apatophyseini
- Genus: Megasticus; Vives, 2004
- Species: M. oberthuerii

Binomial name
- Megasticus oberthuerii (Fairmaire, 1889)

Genus of beetles

Megasticus is a genus in the longhorn beetle family Cerambycidae. This genus has a single species, Megasticus oberthuerii. It is found in Madagascar.
