= Musius crassicornis =

Scientific classification
- Domain: Eukaryota
- Kingdom: Animalia
- Phylum: Arthropoda
- Class: Insecta
- Order: Coleoptera
- Suborder: Polyphaga
- Infraorder: Cucujiformia
- Family: Cerambycidae
- Genus: Musius
- Species: M. crassicornis

Binomial name
- Musius crassicornis Boppe, 1921

Species of beetle

Musius crassicornis is a species of beetle in the family Cerambycidae. It was described by Boppe in 1921.
