= Raharizonina =

Scientific classification
- Kingdom: Animalia
- Phylum: Arthropoda
- Class: Insecta
- Order: Coleoptera
- Suborder: Polyphaga
- Infraorder: Cucujiformia
- Family: Cerambycidae
- Tribe: Apatophyseini
- Genus: Raharizonina; Villiers, 1982
- Species: R. nigrina

Binomial name
- Raharizonina nigrina (Quentin & Villiers, 1979)

Genus of beetles

Raharizonina is a genus in the longhorn beetle family Cerambycidae. This genus has a single species, Raharizonina nigrina. It is found in Comoros.
