= Catalanotoxotus =

Scientific classification
- Kingdom: Animalia
- Phylum: Arthropoda
- Class: Insecta
- Order: Coleoptera
- Suborder: Polyphaga
- Infraorder: Cucujiformia
- Family: Cerambycidae
- Subfamily: Apatophyseinae
- Tribe: Apatophyseini
- Genus: Catalanotoxotus; Vives, 2005

Synonyms
- Catalana Vives, 2004

Genus of beetles

Catalanotoxotus is a genus in the longhorn beetle family Cerambycidae. There are at least two described species in Catalanotoxotus, found in Madagascar.

== Species ==
These two species belong to the genus Catalanotoxotus:

- Catalanotoxotus nivosus Vives, 2005
- Catalanotoxotus pauliani (Vives, 2004)
