= Harimius =

Scientific classification
- Kingdom: Animalia
- Phylum: Arthropoda
- Class: Insecta
- Order: Coleoptera
- Suborder: Polyphaga
- Infraorder: Cucujiformia
- Family: Cerambycidae
- Tribe: Apatophyseini
- Genus: Harimius; Fairmaire, 1889
- Species: H. atripennis

Binomial name
- Harimius atripennis Fairmaire, 1889

Genus of beetles

Harimius is a genus in the longhorn beetle family Cerambycidae. This genus has a single species, Harimius atripennis, found in Madagascar.
