= Apheledes =

Scientific classification
- Domain: Eukaryota
- Kingdom: Animalia
- Phylum: Arthropoda
- Class: Insecta
- Order: Coleoptera
- Suborder: Polyphaga
- Infraorder: Cucujiformia
- Family: Cerambycidae
- Subfamily: Apatophyseinae
- Tribe: Apatophyseini
- Genus: Apheledes; Pascoe, 1888

Genus of beetles

Apheledes is a genus in the longhorn beetle family Cerambycidae. There are at least four described species in Apheledes, found in Madagascar.

== Species ==
These four species belong to the genus Apheledes:

- Apheledes dubius Villiers, Quentin & Vives, 2011
- Apheledes griseobasalis Villiers, Quentin & Vives, 2011
- Apheledes peyrierasi Villiers, Quentin & Vives, 2011
- Apheledes stigmatipennis (Fairmaire, 1887)
