= Tsivoka testaceipes =

Scientific classification
- Kingdom: Animalia
- Phylum: Arthropoda
- Class: Insecta
- Order: Coleoptera
- Suborder: Polyphaga
- Infraorder: Cucujiformia
- Family: Cerambycidae
- Genus: Tsivoka
- Species: T. testaceipes

Binomial name
- Tsivoka testaceipes (Fairmaire, 1889)

Species of beetle

Tsivoka testaceipes is a species of beetle in the family Cerambycidae. It was described by Fairmaire in 1889.
