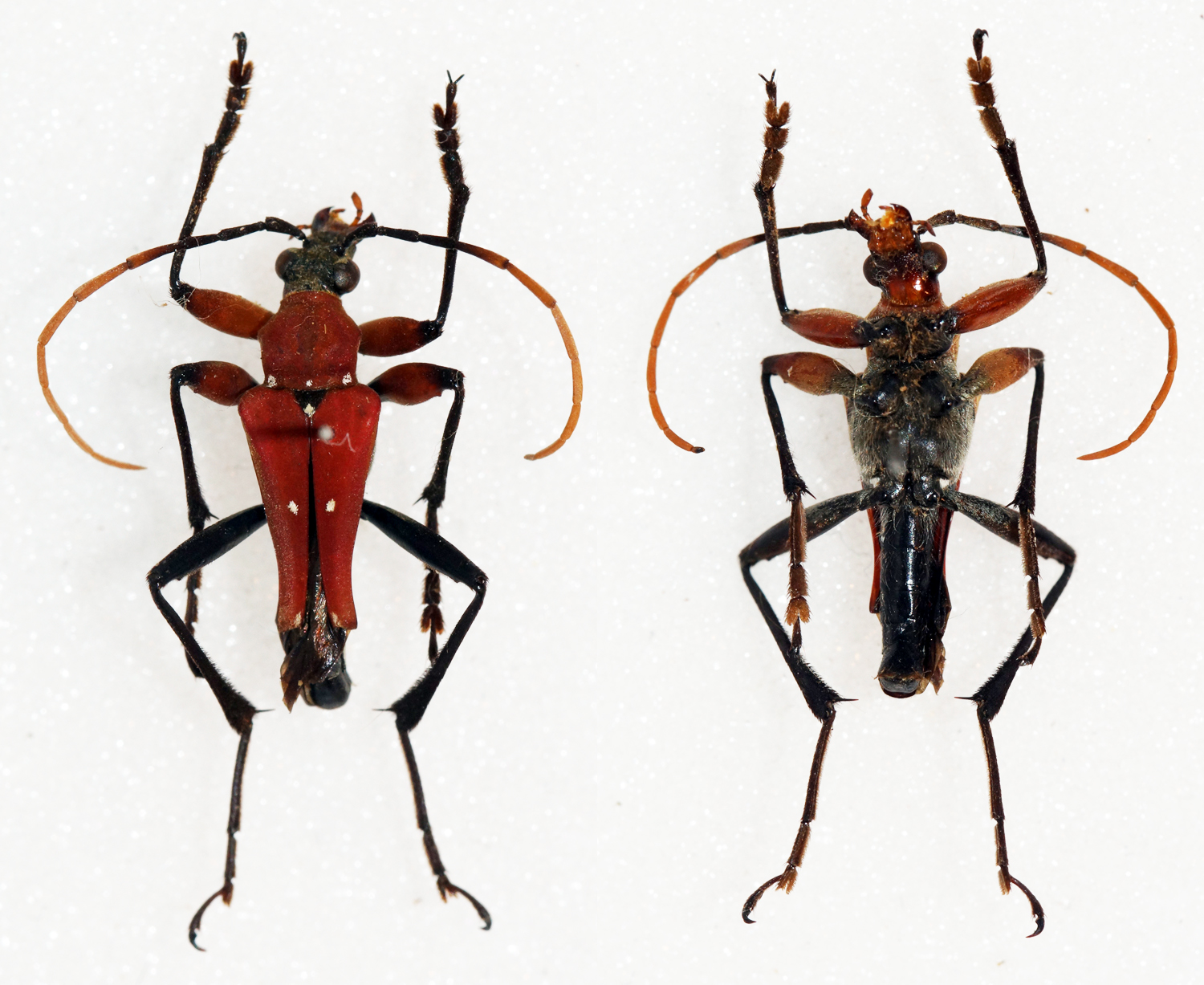
- Stenoxotus ochreoruber, Male, 13 mm

Scientific classification
- Kingdom: Animalia
- Phylum: Arthropoda
- Class: Insecta
- Order: Coleoptera
- Suborder: Polyphaga
- Infraorder: Cucujiformia
- Family: Cerambycidae
- Subfamily: Apatophyseinae
- Tribe: Apatophyseini
- Genus: Stenoxotus; Fairmaire, 1896

= Stenoxotus =

Genus of beetles

Stenoxotus is a genus in the longhorn beetle family Cerambycidae. There are about six described species in Stenoxotus, found in Madagascar.

== Species ==
These six species belong to the genus Stenoxotus:

- Stenoxotus bertiae Vives, 2004
- Stenoxotus humberti Villiers, Quentin & Vives, 2011
- Stenoxotus nigripes Villiers, Quentin & Vives, 2011
- Stenoxotus ochreoruber Fairmaire, 1896
- Stenoxotus stenopteroides Villiers, Quentin & Vives, 2011
- Stenoxotus viossati Villiers, Quentin & Vives, 2011
