= Dysmathosoma =

Scientific classification
- Kingdom: Animalia
- Phylum: Arthropoda
- Class: Insecta
- Order: Coleoptera
- Suborder: Polyphaga
- Infraorder: Cucujiformia
- Family: Cerambycidae
- Subfamily: Apatophyseinae
- Tribe: Apatophyseini
- Genus: Dysmathosoma; Waterhouse, 1882

Genus of beetles

Dysmathosoma is a genus in the longhorn beetle family Cerambycidae. There are at least two described species in Dysmathosoma, found in Madagascar.

== Species ==
These two species belong to the genus Dysmathosoma:

- Dysmathosoma lucidus Vives, 2004
- Dysmathosoma picipes Waterhouse, 1882
