= Dorcianus =

Scientific classification
- Kingdom: Animalia
- Phylum: Arthropoda
- Class: Insecta
- Order: Coleoptera
- Suborder: Polyphaga
- Infraorder: Cucujiformia
- Family: Cerambycidae
- Tribe: Apatophyseini
- Genus: Dorcianus; Fairmaire, 1901
- Species: D. angulicollis

Binomial name
- Dorcianus angulicollis Fairmaire, 1901

Genus of beetles

Dorcianus is a genus in the longhorn beetle family Cerambycidae. This genus has a single species, Dorcianus angulicollis. It is found in Madagascar.
