= Anthribola quinquemaculata =

Scientific classification
- Domain: Eukaryota
- Kingdom: Animalia
- Phylum: Arthropoda
- Class: Insecta
- Order: Coleoptera
- Suborder: Polyphaga
- Infraorder: Cucujiformia
- Family: Cerambycidae
- Genus: Anthribola
- Species: A. quinquemaculata

Binomial name
- Anthribola quinquemaculata (Waterhouse, 1875)

Species of beetle

Anthribola quinquemaculata is a species of beetle in the family Cerambycidae. It was described by Waterhouse in 1875.
