= Logisticus rostratus =

Scientific classification
- Domain: Eukaryota
- Kingdom: Animalia
- Phylum: Arthropoda
- Class: Insecta
- Order: Coleoptera
- Suborder: Polyphaga
- Infraorder: Cucujiformia
- Family: Cerambycidae
- Genus: Logisticus
- Species: L. rostratus

Binomial name
- Logisticus rostratus Waterhouse, 1878

Species of beetle

Logisticus rostratus is a species of beetle in the family Cerambycidae. It was described by Waterhouse in 1878.
