= Cribraedoeus basipennis =

Scientific classification
- Kingdom: Animalia
- Phylum: Arthropoda
- Clade: Pancrustacea
- Class: Insecta
- Order: Coleoptera
- Suborder: Polyphaga
- Infraorder: Cucujiformia
- Family: Cerambycidae
- Genus: Cribraedoeus
- Species: C. basipennis

Binomial name
- Cribraedoeus basipennis (Fairmaire, 1901)

Synonyms
- Icariotis basipennis Aurivillius, 1912

Species of beetle

Cribraedoeus basipennis is a species of long-horned beetle in the beetle family Cerambycidae. It is found in Madagascar.
