= Paratophysis =

Scientific classification
- Kingdom: Animalia
- Phylum: Arthropoda
- Class: Insecta
- Order: Coleoptera
- Suborder: Polyphaga
- Infraorder: Cucujiformia
- Family: Cerambycidae
- Tribe: Apatophyseini
- Genus: Paratophysis; Gressitt & Rondon, 1970
- Species: P. sericea

Binomial name
- Paratophysis sericea (Gressitt & Rondon, 1970)

Genus of beetles

Paratophysis is a genus in the longhorn beetle family Cerambycidae. This genus has a single species, Paratophysis sericea, found in Laos.
