= Icariotis gracilipes =

Scientific classification
- Kingdom: Animalia
- Phylum: Arthropoda
- Class: Insecta
- Order: Coleoptera
- Suborder: Polyphaga
- Infraorder: Cucujiformia
- Family: Cerambycidae
- Genus: Icariotis
- Species: I. gracilipes

Binomial name
- Icariotis gracilipes (Fairmaire, 1902)

Synonyms
- Artelida gracilipes Aurivillius, 1912; Scariotis gracilipes Boppe, 1921

Species of beetle

Icariotis gracilipes is a species in the longhorn beetle family Cerambycidae. It is found in Madagascar.
