= Dalitera =

Scientific classification
- Kingdom: Animalia
- Phylum: Arthropoda
- Class: Insecta
- Order: Coleoptera
- Suborder: Polyphaga
- Infraorder: Cucujiformia
- Family: Cerambycidae
- Subfamily: Apatophyseinae
- Tribe: Apatophyseini
- Genus: Dalitera; Villiers, Quentin & Vives, 2011
- Species: D. calcarata

Binomial name
- Dalitera calcarata (Fairmaire, 1905)

Synonyms
- Artelida calcarata Fairmaire, 1905

Species of beetle

Dalitera is a genus in the longhorn beetle family Cerambycidae. This genus has a single species, Dalitera calcarata. It is found in Madagascar.
