= Scariates =

Scientific classification
- Kingdom: Animalia
- Phylum: Arthropoda
- Class: Insecta
- Order: Coleoptera
- Suborder: Polyphaga
- Infraorder: Cucujiformia
- Family: Cerambycidae
- Tribe: Apatophyseini
- Genus: Scariates; Fairmaire, 1894
- Species: S. basipennis

Binomial name
- Scariates basipennis Fairmaire, 1894

Genus of beetles

Scariates is a genus in the longhorn beetle family Cerambycidae. This genus has a single species, Scariates basipennis. It is found in Madagascar.
