= Barossus kauppi =

Scientific classification
- Kingdom: Animalia
- Phylum: Arthropoda
- Class: Insecta
- Order: Coleoptera
- Suborder: Polyphaga
- Infraorder: Cucujiformia
- Family: Cerambycidae
- Genus: Barossus
- Species: B. kauppi

Binomial name
- Barossus kauppi (Adlbauer, 2001)

Species of beetle

Barossus kauppi is a species of beetle in the family Cerambycidae. It was described by Adlbauer in 2001.
