= Icariotis nigrans =

Scientific classification
- Kingdom: Animalia
- Phylum: Arthropoda
- Class: Insecta
- Order: Coleoptera
- Suborder: Polyphaga
- Infraorder: Cucujiformia
- Family: Cerambycidae
- Genus: Icariotis
- Species: I. nigrans

Binomial name
- Icariotis nigrans Fairmaire, 1901

Synonyms
- Artelida fuscosericans Aurivillius, 1912; Icariotis fuscosericans Boppe, 1921; Scariotis fuscosericans Boppe, 1921

Species of beetle

Icariotis nigrans is a species in the longhorn beetle family Cerambycidae. It is found in Madagascar.
