= Ariastes =

Scientific classification
- Kingdom: Animalia
- Phylum: Arthropoda
- Class: Insecta
- Order: Coleoptera
- Suborder: Polyphaga
- Infraorder: Cucujiformia
- Family: Cerambycidae
- Subfamily: Apatophyseinae
- Tribe: Apatophyseini
- Genus: Ariastes; Fairmaire, 1896

Genus of beetles

Ariastes is a genus in the longhorn beetle family Cerambycidae. There are at least two described species in Ariastes, found in Madagascar.

== Species ==
These two species belong to the genus Ariastes:

- Ariastes monostigma Fairmaire, 1896
- Ariastes muellerae Vives, 2003
