= Planisticus suturalis =

Scientific classification
- Kingdom: Animalia
- Phylum: Arthropoda
- Clade: Pancrustacea
- Class: Insecta
- Order: Coleoptera
- Suborder: Polyphaga
- Infraorder: Cucujiformia
- Family: Cerambycidae
- Genus: Planisticus
- Species: P. suturalis

Binomial name
- Planisticus suturalis (Waterhouse, 1880)

Synonyms
- Logisticus latesulcatus Alluaud, 1900; Logisticus suturalis Corinta-Ferreira & Veiga-Ferreira, 1959

Species of beetle

Planisticus suturalis is a species in the longhorn beetle family Cerambycidae. It is native to Madagascar.
