= Pachysticus =

Scientific classification
- Kingdom: Animalia
- Phylum: Arthropoda
- Class: Insecta
- Order: Coleoptera
- Suborder: Polyphaga
- Infraorder: Cucujiformia
- Family: Cerambycidae
- Subfamily: Apatophyseinae
- Tribe: Apatophyseini
- Genus: Pachysticus; Fairmaire, 1889

Genus of beetles

Pachysticus is a genus in the longhorn beetle family Cerambycidae. There are about seven described species in Pachysticus, found in Madagascar.

== Species ==
These seven species belong to the genus Pachysticus:

- Pachysticus adlbaueri Vives, 2004
- Pachysticus crassipes Fairmaire, 1889
- Pachysticus jenisi Vives, 2004
- Pachysticus minutus Vives, 2004
- Pachysticus morosus (Fairmaire, 1894)
- Pachysticus nigrofasciatus Vives, 2004
- Pachysticus peyrierasi Villiers, Quentin & Vives, 2011
