= Planisticus =

Scientific classification
- Domain: Eukaryota
- Kingdom: Animalia
- Phylum: Arthropoda
- Class: Insecta
- Order: Coleoptera
- Suborder: Polyphaga
- Infraorder: Cucujiformia
- Family: Cerambycidae
- Subfamily: Apatophyseinae
- Tribe: Apatophyseini
- Genus: Planisticus; Vives, 2004

Genus of beetles

Planisticus is a genus in the longhorn beetle family Cerambycidae. There are at least three described species in Planisticus, found in Madagascar.

== Species ==
These three species belong to the genus Planisticus:

- Planisticus breuningi Vives, 2004
- Planisticus nivosus (Fairmaire, 1893)
- Planisticus suturalis (Waterhouse, 1880)
