= Catalanotoxotus pauliani =

Scientific classification
- Kingdom: Animalia
- Phylum: Arthropoda
- Class: Insecta
- Order: Coleoptera
- Suborder: Polyphaga
- Infraorder: Cucujiformia
- Family: Cerambycidae
- Genus: Catalanotoxotus
- Species: C. pauliani

Binomial name
- Catalanotoxotus pauliani (Vives, 2004)

Species of beetle

Catalanotoxotus pauliani is a species of beetle in the family Cerambycidae. It was described by Vives in 2004.
