= Alityros =

Alityros (also spelled Aliturus) was a Jewish mime actor associated with the court of Roman emperor Nero in the 1st century CE. Josephus credits Alityros with arranging an introduction to Empress Poppaea Sabina, who interceded on behalf of Jewish priests whom the procurator Antonius Felix had sent to Rome for trial.

Some scholars have suggested that Alityros may have been a freed slave.

== Historicity ==
Alityros is not mentioned outside of Josephus' writings, and the name Alityros is otherwise unattested in extant Greco-Roman or Jewish sources; construed as Greek (Ἁλίτυρος) it would mean "salt cheese," an unusual personal name. This has led to the suggestion that Josephus may have invented the figure, either as a literary comment on the influence of actors and women at Nero's court, or as a substitute for the better-known actor Paris.

== In literature ==
In Henryk Sienkiewicz's novel Quo Vadis (1896), Alityros appears as a character who instructs Nero in gesticulation and accompanies him to Greece.
