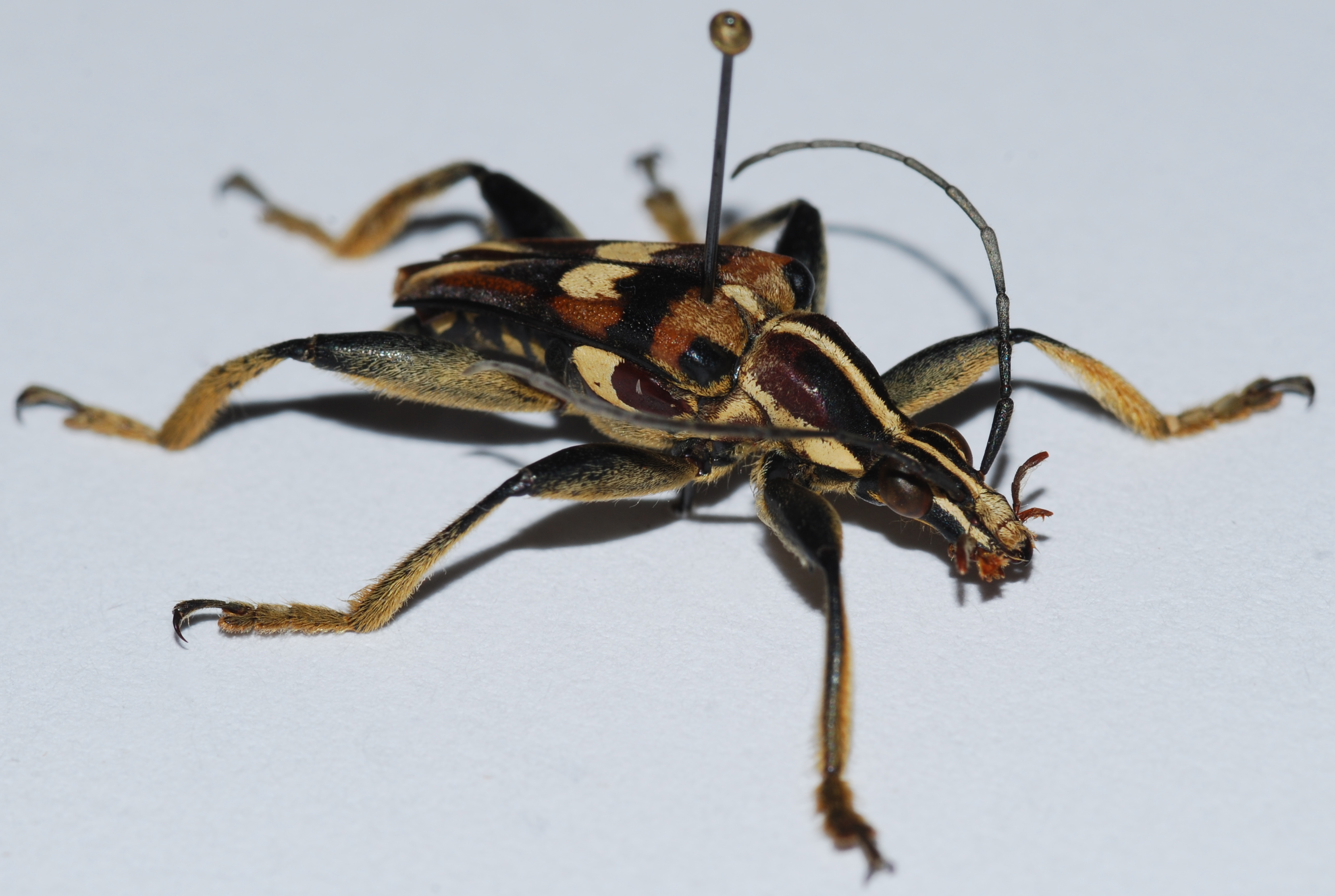
- Anthribola decoratus

Scientific classification
- Domain: Eukaryota
- Kingdom: Animalia
- Phylum: Arthropoda
- Class: Insecta
- Order: Coleoptera
- Suborder: Polyphaga
- Infraorder: Cucujiformia
- Family: Cerambycidae
- Subfamily: Apatophyseinae
- Tribe: Apatophyseini
- Genus: Anthribola; Bates, 1879

= Anthribola =

Genus of beetles

Anthribola is a genus in the longhorn beetle family Cerambycidae. There are about 11 described species in Anthribola, found in Madagascar.

== Species ==
These 11 species belong to the genus Anthribola:

- Anthribola citrina Villiers, Quentin & Vives, 2011
- Anthribola debilis Villiers, Quentin & Vives, 2011
- Anthribola decoratus Bates, 1879
- Anthribola femorata Waterhouse, 1882
- Anthribola nana Villiers, Quentin & Vives, 2011
- Anthribola obliquata Villiers, Quentin & Vives, 2011
- Anthribola pilipes Villiers, Quentin & Vives, 2011
- Anthribola quinquemaculata (Waterhouse, 1875)
- Anthribola rufoguttata Villiers, Quentin & Vives, 2011
- Anthribola tsaratanana Villiers, Quentin & Vives, 2011
- Anthribola vicina Villiers, Quentin & Vives, 2011
