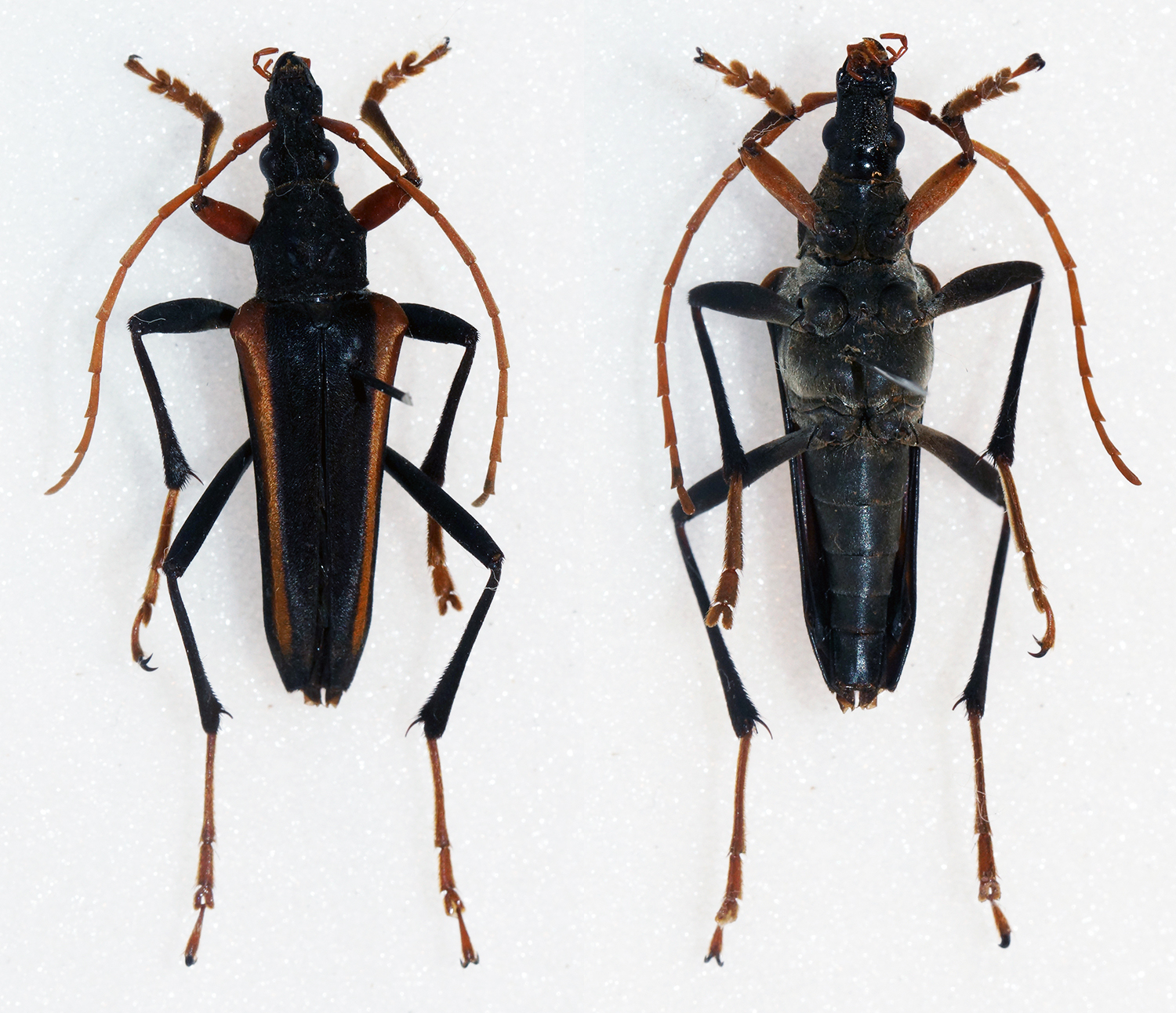
- Tsivoka simplicicollis, female, 16.5 mm

Scientific classification
- Kingdom: Animalia
- Phylum: Arthropoda
- Class: Insecta
- Order: Coleoptera
- Suborder: Polyphaga
- Infraorder: Cucujiformia
- Family: Cerambycidae
- Subfamily: Dorcasominae
- Genus: Tsivoka; Villiers, 1982

= Tsivoka =

Genus of beetles

Tsivoka is a genus in the longhorn beetle family Cerambycidae. There are at least three described species in Tsivoka, found in Madagascar.

== Species ==
These three species belong to the genus Tsivoka:

- Tsivoka peyrierasi Villiers, 1982
- Tsivoka simplicicollis (Gahan, 1890)
- Tsivoka testaceipes (Fairmaire, 1889)
