= Aedoeus =

Scientific classification
- Domain: Eukaryota
- Kingdom: Animalia
- Phylum: Arthropoda
- Class: Insecta
- Order: Coleoptera
- Suborder: Polyphaga
- Infraorder: Cucujiformia
- Family: Cerambycidae
- Subfamily: Apatophyseinae
- Tribe: Apatophyseini
- Genus: Aedoeus; Waterhouse, 1880

Genus of beetles

Aedoeus is a genus in the longhorn beetle family Cerambycidae. There are about five described species in Aedoeus.

== Species ==
These five species belong to the genus Aedoeus:

- Aedoeus alosternoides Villiers, Quentin & Vives, 2011 (Madagascar)
- Aedoeus anjouanensis Quentin & Villiers, 1979 (Comoros)
- Aedoeus curtus Villiers, Quentin & Vives, 2011 (Madagascar)
- Aedoeus geniculatus Waterhouse, 1880 (Madagascar)
- Aedoeus vieui Villiers, Quentin & Vives, 2011 (Madagascar)
