= Epitophysis =

Scientific classification
- Kingdom: Animalia
- Phylum: Arthropoda
- Class: Insecta
- Order: Coleoptera
- Suborder: Polyphaga
- Infraorder: Cucujiformia
- Family: Cerambycidae
- Genus: Epitophysis; Gressitt & Rondon, 1970
- Species: E. substriata

Binomial name
- Epitophysis substriata (Gressitt & Rondon, 1970)

Synonyms
- Apatophysis substriata Gressitt & Rondon, 1970

Genus of beetles

Epitophysis is a genus of beetles in the family Cerambycidae, and the only species in the genus is Epitophysis substriata. It was described by Gressitt and Rondon in 1970.
