= Icariotis =

Scientific classification
- Kingdom: Animalia
- Phylum: Arthropoda
- Class: Insecta
- Order: Coleoptera
- Suborder: Polyphaga
- Infraorder: Cucujiformia
- Family: Cerambycidae
- Subfamily: Apatophyseinae
- Tribe: Apatophyseini
- Genus: Icariotis; Pascoe, 1888

Genus of beetles

Icariotis is a genus of beetles in the family Cerambycidae. There are about 15 described species in Icariotis, found in Madagascar.

== Species ==
These 15 species belong to the genus Icariotis:

- Icariotis concolor Villiers, Quentin & Vives, 2011
- Icariotis fulvicornis Pascoe, 1888
- Icariotis gracilipes (Fairmaire, 1902)
- Icariotis limbipennis Fairmaire, 1901
- Icariotis marginata Villiers, Quentin & Vives, 2011
- Icariotis minuta Villiers, Quentin & Vives, 2011
- Icariotis nigrans Fairmaire, 1901
- Icariotis politicollis Fairmaire, 1905
- Icariotis pruinosa Fairmaire, 1901
- Icariotis scapularis Pascoe, 1888
- Icariotis subsulcata Fairmaire, 1893
- Icariotis testacea Fairmaire, 1901
- Icariotis unicolor Pascoe, 1888
- Icariotis vicina Villiers, Quentin & Vives, 2011
- Icariotis viettei Villiers, Quentin & Vives, 2011
