= Logisticus =

Scientific classification
- Kingdom: Animalia
- Phylum: Arthropoda
- Clade: Pancrustacea
- Class: Insecta
- Order: Coleoptera
- Suborder: Polyphaga
- Infraorder: Cucujiformia
- Family: Cerambycidae
- Subfamily: Dorcasominae
- Genus: Logisticus; Waterhouse, 1878

Genus of beetles

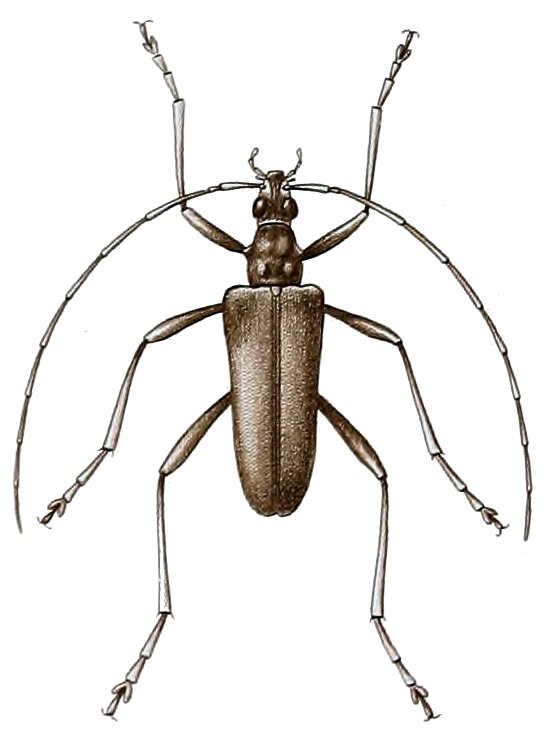

Logisticus is a genus in the longhorn beetle family Cerambycidae. There are about 18 described species in Logisticus, found in Madagascar.

== Species ==
These 18 species belong to the genus Logisticus:

- Logisticus angustatus Waterhouse, 1880
- Logisticus bicolor Vives, 2004
- Logisticus castaneus Villiers, Quentin & Vives, 2011
- Logisticus fuscopunctatus Fairmaire, 1903
- Logisticus iners Fairmaire, 1903
- Logisticus inexpunctatus (Fairmaire, 1903)
- Logisticus modestus Waterhouse, 1882
- Logisticus obscurus Waterhouse, 1880
- Logisticus obtusipennis Fairmaire, 1901
- Logisticus platypodus Villiers, Quentin & Vives, 2011
- Logisticus proboscideus Fairmaire, 1902
- Logisticus quentini Vives, 2004
- Logisticus rostratus Waterhouse, 1878
- Logisticus simplex Waterhouse, 1880
- Logisticus spinipennis Fairmaire, 1893
- Logisticus ungulatus Villiers, Quentin & Vives, 2011
- Logisticus unidentatus Villiers, Quentin & Vives, 2011
- Logisticus villiersi Vives, 2004
