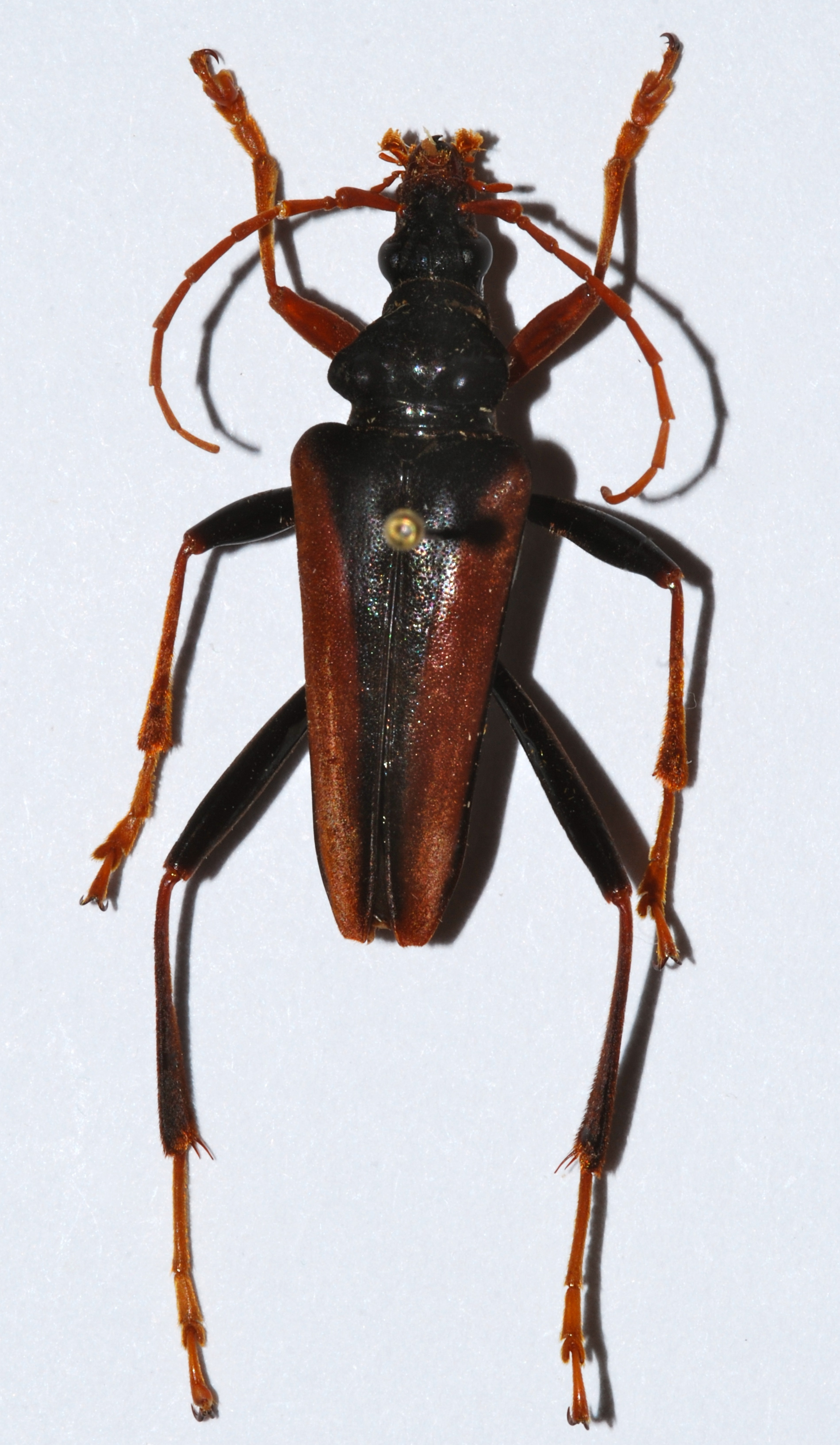
- Mastododera lateralis

Scientific classification
- Kingdom: Animalia
- Phylum: Arthropoda
- Clade: Pancrustacea
- Class: Insecta
- Order: Coleoptera
- Suborder: Polyphaga
- Infraorder: Cucujiformia
- Family: Cerambycidae
- Subfamily: Apatophyseinae; Lacordaire, 1869
- Tribe: Apatophyseini; Lacordaire, 1869

Synonyms
- Apatophysides Lacordaire, 1869; Apatophysini Lacordaire, 1869 (misspelling)

= Apatophyseini =

Tribe of longhorn beetles

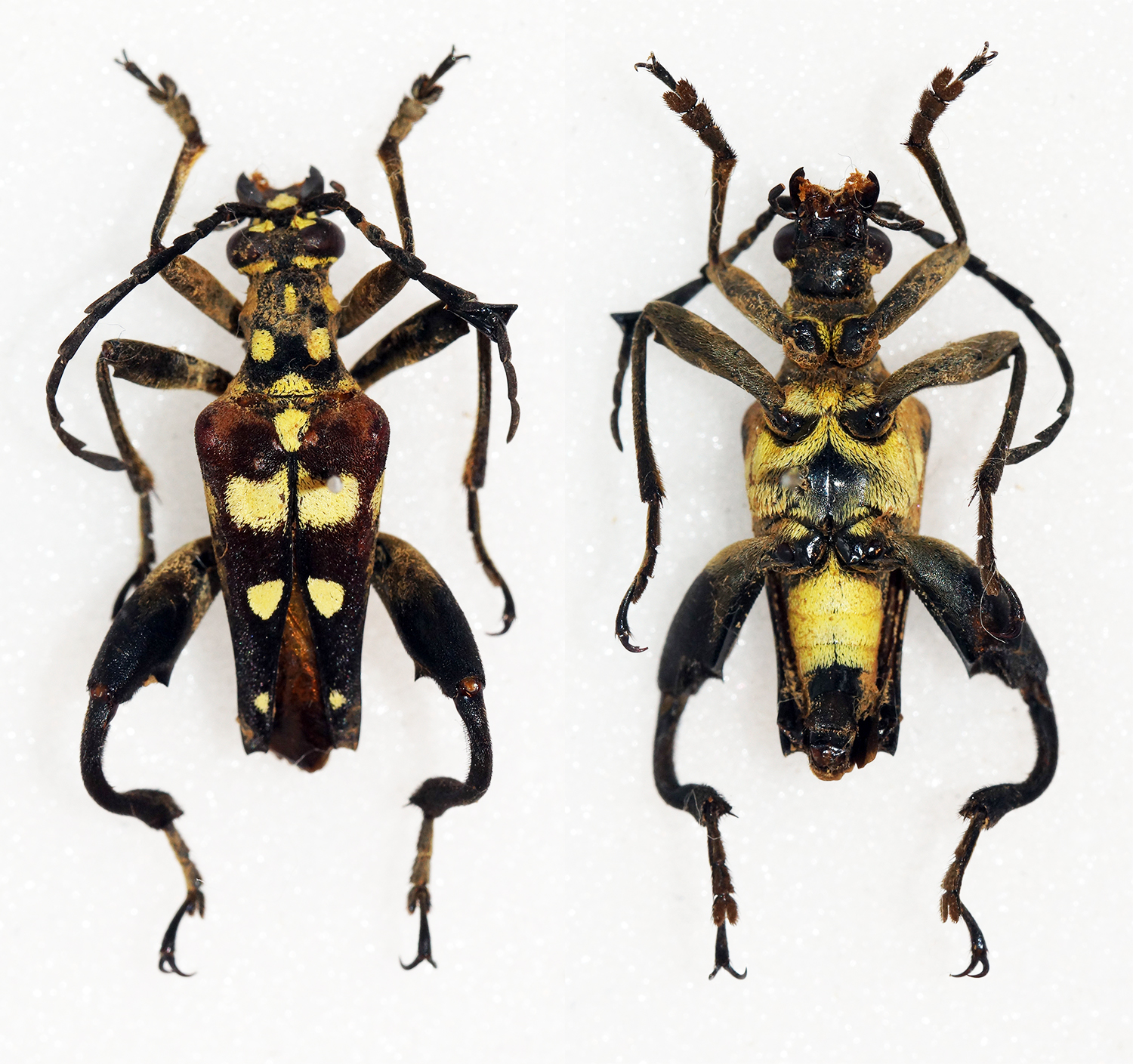
Sagridola maculosa

The Apatophyseini are a tribe of longhorn beetles erected by Lacordaire in 1869. They are placed in the monotypic subfamily Apatophyseinae.

Apatophyseini is a tribe in the longhorn beetle family Cerambycidae. There are at least 90 genera and more than 300 described species in Apatophyseini, found in Europe, Asia, and Africa. Around 250 of these species are native to Madagascar.

Apatophyseini is the only tribe in the subfamily Apatophyseinae, although it has sometimes been treated as a tribe in the subfamily Dorcasominae.

== Genera ==
These 90 genera belong to the tribe Apatophyseini:

1. Aedoeus Waterhouse, 1880
2. Agastophysis Miroshnikov, 2014
3. Aliturus Fairmaire, 1902
4. Alleculaedoeus Villiers, Quentin & Vives, 2011
5. Analogisticus Miroshnikov, 2014
6. Andringitrina Villiers, Quentin & Vives, 2011
7. Ankirihitra Villiers, Quentin & Vives, 2011
8. Anosibella Villiers, Quentin & Vives, 2011
9. Anthribola Bates, 1879
10. Antigenes Pascoe, 1888
11. Apatobatus Vives & Heffern, 2012
12. Apatophysis Chevrolat, 1860
13. Apheledes Pascoe, 1888
14. Appedesis Waterhouse, 1880
15. Ariastes Fairmaire, 1896
16. Artelida Thomson, 1864
17. Barossus Fairmaire, 1893
18. Bejofoana Villiers, Quentin & Vives, 2011
19. Boppeus Villiers, 1982
20. Brachymyiodola Villiers, Quentin & Vives, 2011
21. Catalanotoxotus Vives, 2005
22. Cribraedoeus Villiers, Quentin & Vives, 2011
23. Criocerinus Fairmaire, 1894
24. Dalitera Villiers, Quentin & Vives, 2011
25. Dinopteroides Villiers, Quentin & Vives, 2011
26. Dorcianus Fairmaire, 1901
27. Dotoramades Villiers, 1982
28. Dysmathosoma Waterhouse, 1882
29. Eccrisis Pascoe, 1888
30. Echaristha Fairmaire, 1901
31. Enthymius Waterhouse, 1878
32. Epitophysis Gressitt & Rondon, 1970
33. Eupalelius Fairmaire, 1896
34. Formosotoxotus Hayashi, 1960
35. Gaurotinus Fairmaire, 1897
36. Harimius Fairmaire, 1889
37. Heteraedoeus Villiers, Quentin & Vives, 2011
38. Hukaruana Villiers, Quentin & Vives, 2011
39. Hypogenes Villiers, Quentin & Vives, 2011
40. Icariotis Pascoe, 1888
41. Leonaedoeus Villiers, Quentin & Vives, 2011
42. Leptopycna Adlbauer, 2020
43. Lepturasta Fairmaire, 1901
44. Lepturomyia Quentin, 2000
45. Lepturovespa Villiers, Quentin & Vives, 2011
46. Lingoria Fairmaire, 1901
47. Logisticus Waterhouse, 1878
48. Malagassycarilia Villiers, Quentin & Vives, 2011
49. Mastododera Thomson, 1857
50. Megasticus Vives, 2004
51. Mimapatophysis Miroshnikov, 2014
52. Molorchineus Villiers, Quentin & Vives, 2011
53. Musius Fairmaire, 1889
54. Omodylia Villiers, Quentin & Vives, 2011
55. Pachysticus Fairmaire, 1889
56. Parakimerus Villiers, Quentin & Vives, 2011
57. Paralogisticus Vives, 2006
58. Paratophysis Gressitt & Rondon, 1970
59. Pareccrisis Villiers, Quentin & Vives, 2011
60. Parecharista Villiers, Quentin & Vives, 2011
61. Paulianacmaeops Villiers, Quentin & Vives, 2011
62. Phitryonus Fairmaire, 1903
63. Phyllotodes Adlbauer, 2001
64. Planisticus Vives, 2004
65. Protapatophysis Semenov & Schegoleva-Barovskaya, 1936
66. Pseudogenes Fairmaire, 1894
67. Pseudomusius Villiers, Quentin & Vives, 2011
68. Raharizonina Villiers, 1982
69. Ramodatodes Villiers, 1982
70. Sagridola Thomson, 1864
71. Scariates Fairmaire, 1894
72. Scopanta Fairmaire, 1893
73. Sitiorica Villiers, Quentin & Vives, 2011
74. Soalalana Villiers, Quentin & Vives, 2011
75. Stenotsivoka Adlbauer, 2001
76. Stenoxotus Fairmaire, 1896
77. Strophophysis Miroshnikov, 2014
78. Suzelia Villiers, 1982
79. Tomobrachyta Fairmaire, 1887
80. Toxitiades Fairmaire, 1893
81. Trichartelida Villiers, Quentin & Vives, 2011
82. Trichroa Fairmaire, 1894
83. Tsivoka Villiers, 1982
84. Urasomus Adlbauer, 2012
85. Vadonitoxotus Villiers, Quentin & Vives, 2011
86. Villiersicus Vives, 2005
87. Viossatus Villiers, Quentin & Vives, 2011
88. Xanthopiodus Fairmaire, 1897
89. Zulphis Fairmaire, 1893
90. Zulphisoma Villiers, Quentin & Vives, 2011
