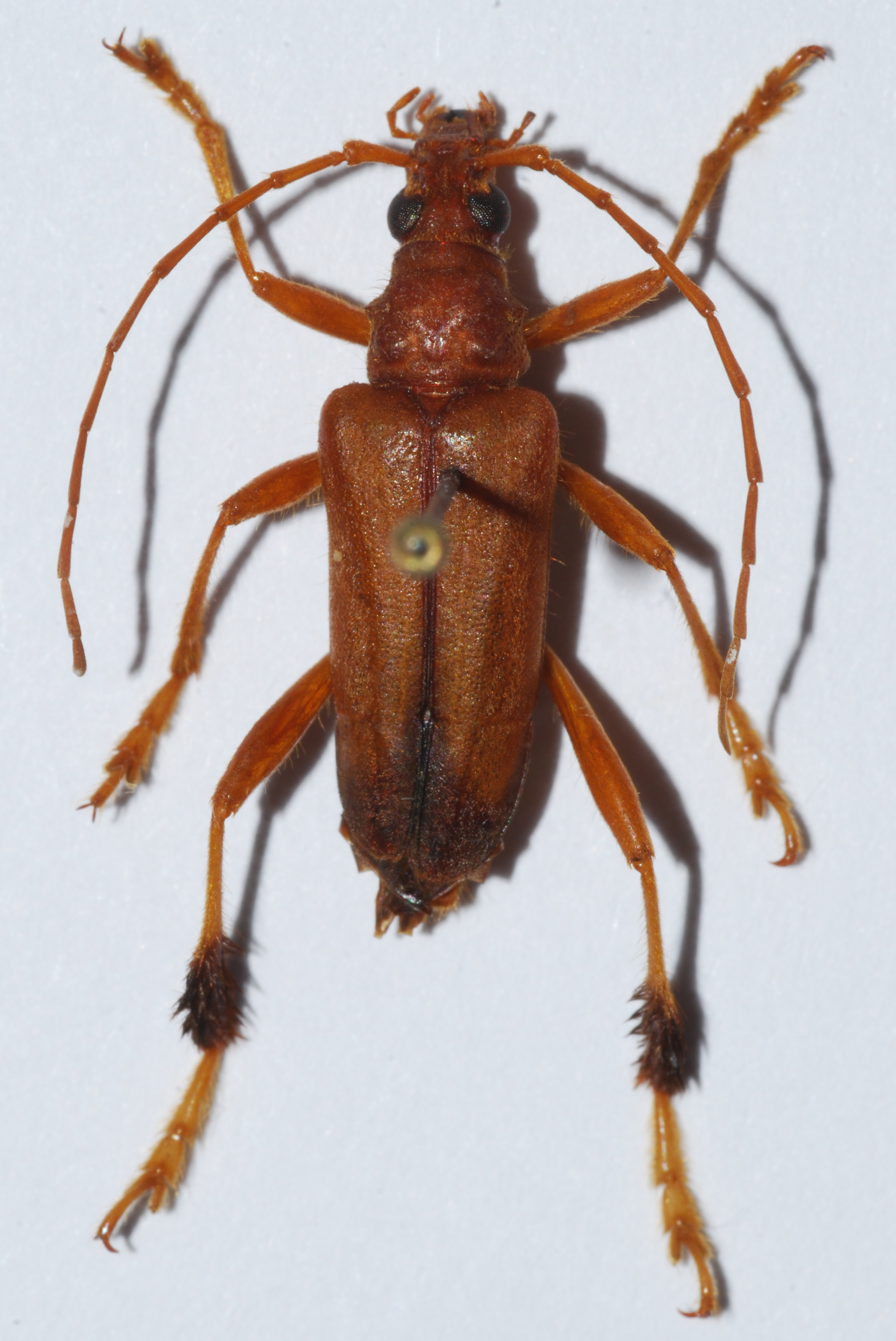
- Artelida crinipes, Madagascar

Scientific classification
- Kingdom: Animalia
- Phylum: Arthropoda
- Class: Insecta
- Order: Coleoptera
- Suborder: Polyphaga
- Infraorder: Cucujiformia
- Family: Cerambycidae
- Subfamily: Apatophyseinae
- Tribe: Apatophyseini
- Genus: Artelida; Thomson, 1864

= Artelida =

Genus of beetles

Artelida is a genus in the longhorn beetle family, Cerambycidae. About 14 described species in Artelida are found in Madagascar.

== Species ==
These 14 species belong to the genus Artelida:

- Artelida asperata Waterhouse, 1880
- Artelida aurosericea Waterhouse, 1882
- Artelida bifida Villiers, Quentin & Vives, 2011
- Artelida castanea Villiers, Quentin & Vives, 2011
- Artelida crinipes Thomson, 1864
- Artelida cuprea Villiers, Quentin & Vives, 2011
- Artelida diversitarsis Fairmaire, 1902
- Artelida gracilipes Fairmaire, 1902
- Artelida holoxantha Fairmaire, 1902
- Artelida insularis Villiers, Quentin & Vives, 2011
- Artelida lokobensis Villiers, Quentin & Vives, 2011
- Artelida longicollis Villiers, Quentin & Vives, 2011
- Artelida pernobilis Van de Poll, 1890
- Artelida triangularis Villiers, Quentin & Vives, 2011
- Artelida villosimana Fairmaire, 1903
