= Viridans =

Viridans may refer to:

- Viridans streptococci, large group of bacteria species
- Achatinella viridans, species of mollusc
- Aerococcus viridans, species of bacteria
- Apotoforma viridans, species of moth
- Blennidus viridans, species of ground beetle
- Ericydeus viridans, species of true weevil
- Eucalyptus socialis subsp. viridans, species of plant
- Gymnopilus viridans, species of mushroom
- Pasimachus viridans, species of ground beetle
- Peucetia viridans, species of spider
- Sorotacta viridans, species of moth
- Synema viridans, species of crab spider
- Thalassomonas viridans, species of bacteria
- Trichiotinus viridans, species of beetle
