= Negrei =

Negrei may refer to

- Several species of beetles, including
  - Blennidus negrei
  - Metius negrei
  - Mecyclothorax negrei
  - Stenotsivoka negrei
- Ion Negrei (born 1958), Moldovan politician
- Pârâul Negrei, a tributary of the Moldova River in Romania
