= Blennidus rufescens =

Scientific classification
- Kingdom: Animalia
- Phylum: Arthropoda
- Clade: Pancrustacea
- Class: Insecta
- Order: Coleoptera
- Suborder: Adephaga
- Family: Carabidae
- Genus: Blennidus
- Species: B. rufescens

Binomial name
- Blennidus rufescens (Solier, 1849)

Species of beetle

Blennidus rufescens is a species of ground beetle in the subfamily Pterostichinae. It was described by Solier in 1849.
