= Carabus lefebvrei bayardi =

Scientific classification
- Kingdom: Animalia
- Phylum: Arthropoda
- Clade: Pancrustacea
- Class: Insecta
- Order: Coleoptera
- Suborder: Adephaga
- Family: Carabidae
- Genus: Carabus
- Species: C. lefebvrei
- Subspecies: C. l. bayardi

Trinomial name
- Carabus lefebvrei bayardi Solier, 1835

Synonyms
- Carabus intricatus bayardi Solier, 1835

Subspecies of beetle

Carabus lefebvrei bayardi is a subspecies of bluish-black coloured ground beetle in the subfamily Carabinae that is endemic to Italy.
