= Austrocardiophorus elegans =

Scientific classification
- Kingdom: Animalia
- Phylum: Arthropoda
- Class: Insecta
- Order: Coleoptera
- Suborder: Polyphaga
- Infraorder: Elateriformia
- Family: Elateridae
- Subfamily: Cardiophorinae
- Tribe: Cardiophorini
- Genus: Austrocardiophorus
- Species: A. elegans

Binomial name
- Austrocardiophorus elegans (Solier, 1851)

Synonyms
- Cardiophorus elegans Candèze, 1878

Species of beetle

Austrocardiophorus elegans is a species in the click beetle family Elateridae, found in Chile. It was formerly a member of the genus Cardiophorus .
