= B. montanus =

B. montanus may refer to:

- Batrachylodes montanus, a frog species endemic to Papua New Guinea
- Blennidus montanus, a ground beetle species
- Buthus montanus, a scorpion species found in Spain
