= Apotoforma monochroma =

Scientific classification
- Domain: Eukaryota
- Kingdom: Animalia
- Phylum: Arthropoda
- Class: Insecta
- Order: Lepidoptera
- Family: Tortricidae
- Genus: Apotoforma
- Species: A. monochroma

Binomial name
- Apotoforma monochroma (Walsingham, 1897)

Synonyms
- Oxygrapha monochroma Walsingham, 1897

Species of moth

Apotoforma monochroma is a species of moth of the family Tortricidae. It is found in Haiti.

The wingspan is about 12 mm. The forewings are reddish brown, with slightly paler mottling on the outer half and a slight shining greyish shade preceded by a slender ferruginous line before the termen. The hindwings are dark fuscous.
