= Apotoforma dolosa =

Scientific classification
- Kingdom: Animalia
- Phylum: Arthropoda
- Clade: Pancrustacea
- Class: Insecta
- Order: Lepidoptera
- Family: Tortricidae
- Genus: Apotoforma
- Species: A. dolosa

Binomial name
- Apotoforma dolosa (Walsingham, 1914)

Synonyms
- Polyortha dolosa Walsingham, 1914

Species of moth

Apotoforma dolosa is a species of moth of the family Tortricidae. It is found in Guatemala and Colombia.

The wingspan is about 14 mm.

The holotype is accessioned at the British Museum of Natural History, and its locality is Verapaz, Guatemala.
