= Blennidus tenenbaumi =

Scientific classification
- Kingdom: Animalia
- Phylum: Arthropoda
- Clade: Pancrustacea
- Class: Insecta
- Order: Coleoptera
- Suborder: Adephaga
- Family: Carabidae
- Genus: Blennidus
- Species: B. tenenbaumi

Binomial name
- Blennidus tenenbaumi (Lutshnik, 1927)

Species of beetle

Blennidus tenenbaumi is a species of ground beetle in the subfamily Pterostichinae. It was described by Lutshnik in 1927.
