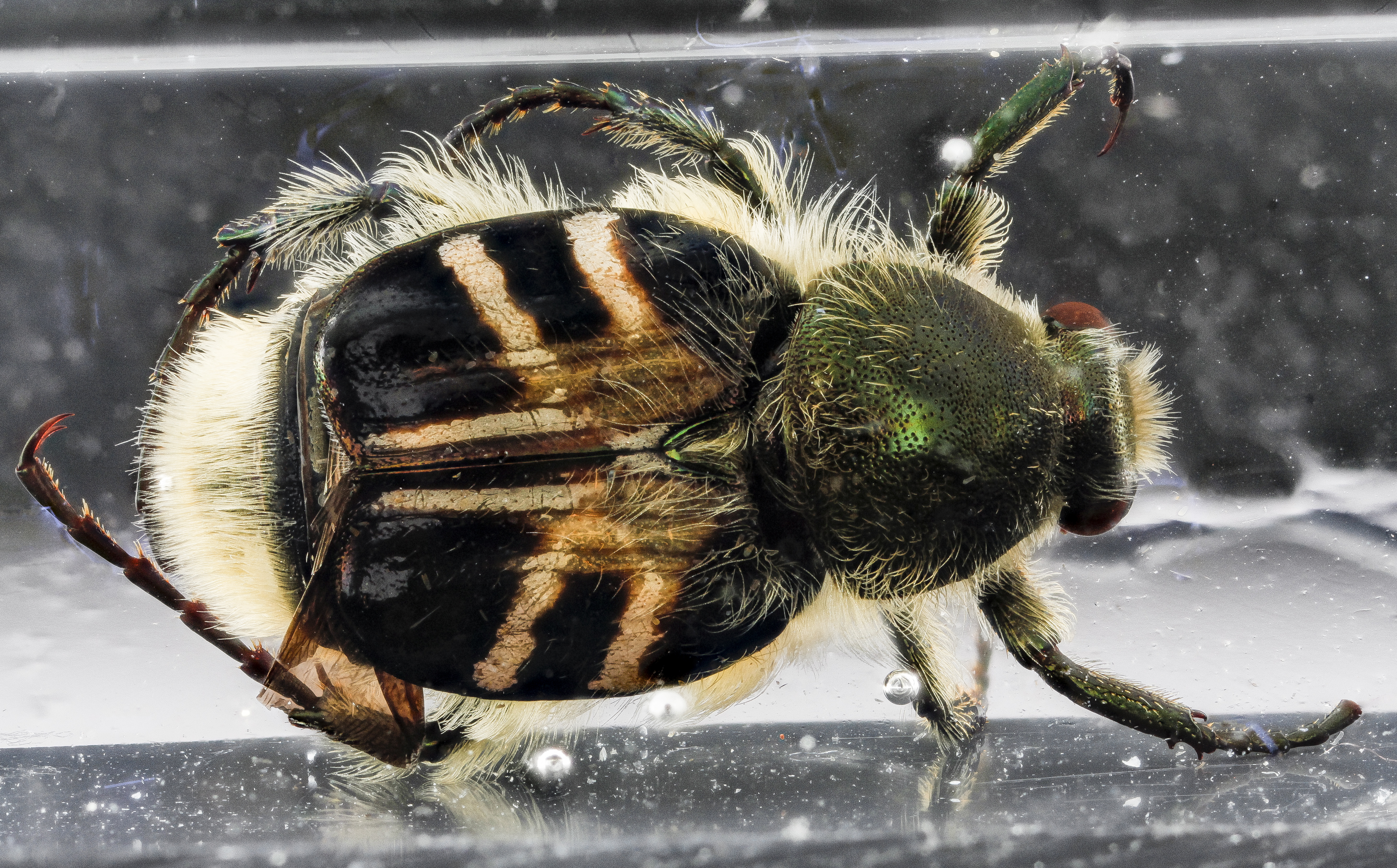

Scientific classification
- Kingdom: Animalia
- Phylum: Arthropoda
- Clade: Pancrustacea
- Class: Insecta
- Order: Coleoptera
- Suborder: Polyphaga
- Infraorder: Scarabaeiformia
- Family: Scarabaeidae
- Genus: Trichiotinus
- Species: T. assimilis

Binomial name
- Trichiotinus assimilis (Kirby, 1837)

Synonyms
- Trichius bistriga Newman, 1838

= Trichiotinus assimilis =

Species of beetle

Trichiotinus assimilis, known generally as the hairy flower scarab or bee-mimic beetle, is a species of scarab beetle or flower chafers in the family Scarabaeidae. It is found in North America.

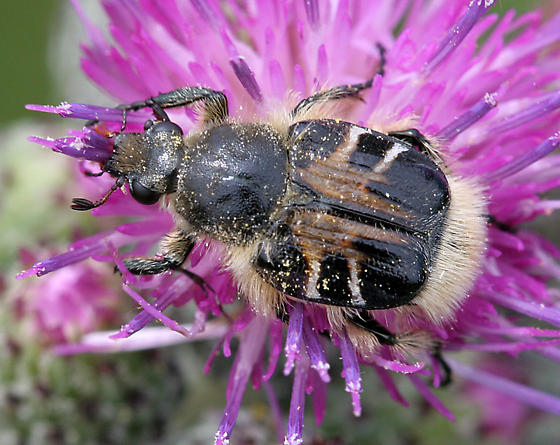
Hairy flower scarab, Trichiotinus assimilis
