= Blennidus calathoides =

Scientific classification
- Kingdom: Animalia
- Phylum: Arthropoda
- Clade: Pancrustacea
- Class: Insecta
- Order: Coleoptera
- Suborder: Adephaga
- Family: Carabidae
- Genus: Blennidus
- Species: B. calathoides

Binomial name
- Blennidus calathoides (G.R.Waterhouse, 1845)

Species of beetle

Blennidus calathoides is a species of ground beetle in the subfamily Pterostichinae. It was described by G.R.Waterhouse in 1845.
