= Blennidus mediolaevis =

Scientific classification
- Kingdom: Animalia
- Phylum: Arthropoda
- Clade: Pancrustacea
- Class: Insecta
- Order: Coleoptera
- Suborder: Adephaga
- Family: Carabidae
- Genus: Blennidus
- Species: B. mediolaevis

Binomial name
- Blennidus mediolaevis (Chaudoir, 1876)

Species of beetle

Blennidus mediolaevis is a species of ground beetle in the subfamily Pterostichinae. It was described by Maximilien Chaudoir in 1876.
