= Trichiotinus bibens =

Scientific classification
- Domain: Eukaryota
- Kingdom: Animalia
- Phylum: Arthropoda
- Class: Insecta
- Order: Coleoptera
- Suborder: Polyphaga
- Infraorder: Scarabaeiformia
- Family: Scarabaeidae
- Genus: Trichiotinus
- Species: T. bibens

Binomial name
- Trichiotinus bibens (Fabricius, 1775)

Species of beetle

Trichiotinus bibens is a species of scarab beetle in the family Scarabaeidae.
