= Apotoforma kakamegae =

Scientific classification
- Domain: Eukaryota
- Kingdom: Animalia
- Phylum: Arthropoda
- Class: Insecta
- Order: Lepidoptera
- Family: Tortricidae
- Genus: Apotoforma
- Species: A. kakamegae

Binomial name
- Apotoforma kakamegae Razowski, 2012

Species of moth

Apotoforma kakamegae is a species of moth of the family Tortricidae that is endemic to Kenya.

The wingspan is about 14 millimetres (0.55 in).

== Etymology ==
The species name refers to the type locality.
