= Blennidus plaumanni =

Scientific classification
- Kingdom: Animalia
- Phylum: Arthropoda
- Clade: Pancrustacea
- Class: Insecta
- Order: Coleoptera
- Suborder: Adephaga
- Family: Carabidae
- Genus: Blennidus
- Species: B. plaumanni

Binomial name
- Blennidus plaumanni (Emden, 1949)

Species of beetle

Blennidus plaumanni is a species of ground beetle in the subfamily Pterostichinae. It was described by Emden in 1949.
