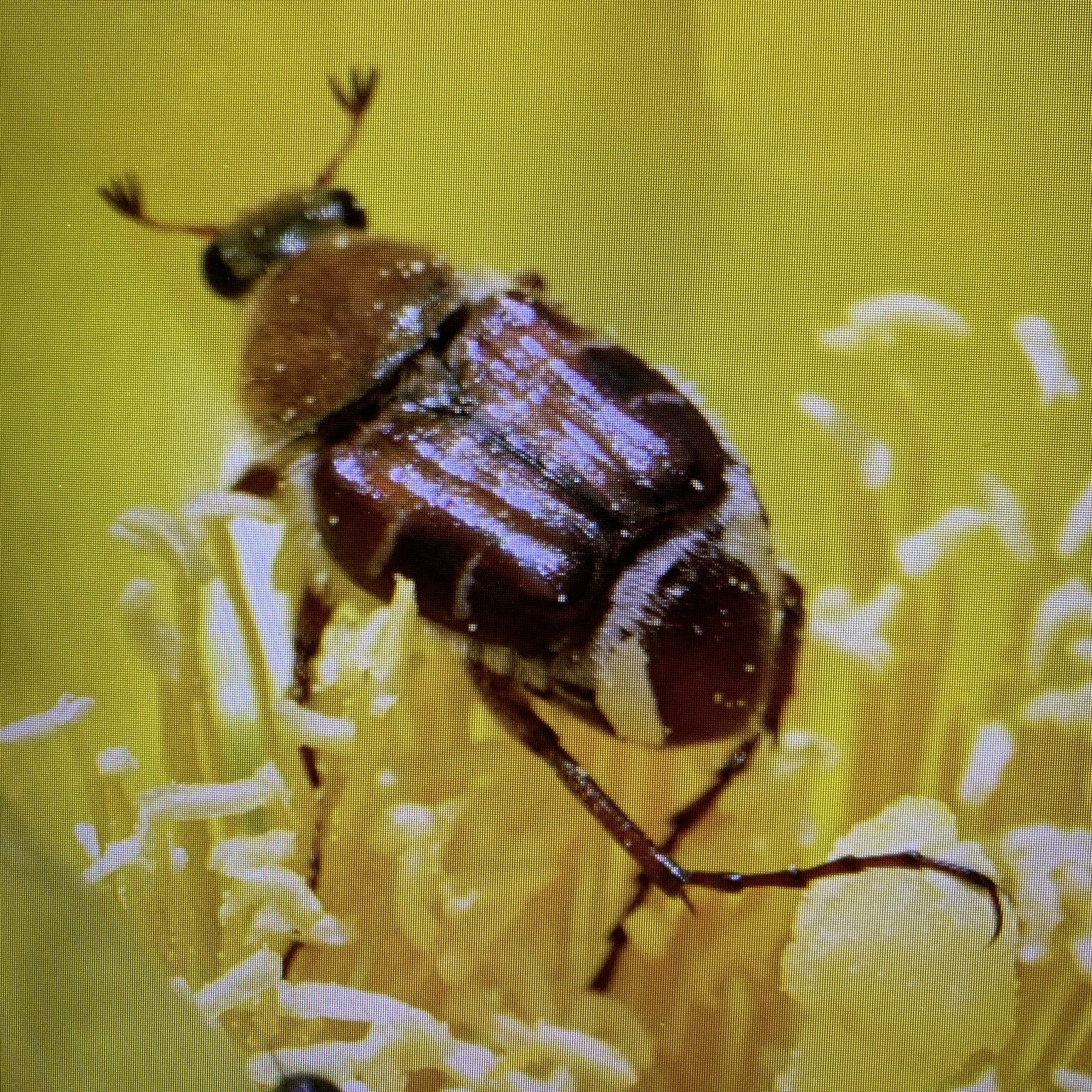

Scientific classification
- Kingdom: Animalia
- Phylum: Arthropoda
- Class: Insecta
- Order: Coleoptera
- Suborder: Polyphaga
- Infraorder: Scarabaeiformia
- Family: Scarabaeidae
- Genus: Trichiotinus
- Species: T. rufobrunneus

Binomial name
- Trichiotinus rufobrunneus (Casey, 1914)

Synonyms
- Trichius obesulus Casey, 1914

= Trichiotinus rufobrunneus =

Species of beetle

Trichiotinus rufobrunneus is a species of scarab beetle in the family Scarabaeidae.
