= Apotoforma jamaicana =

Scientific classification
- Kingdom: Animalia
- Phylum: Arthropoda
- Class: Insecta
- Order: Lepidoptera
- Family: Tortricidae
- Genus: Apotoforma
- Species: A. jamaicana

Binomial name
- Apotoforma jamaicana Razowski, 1964

Species of moth

Apotoforma jamaicana is a species of moth of the family Tortricidae. It is found in Jamaica.

The wingspan is about 12 mm.
