= Blennidus rectangulus =

Scientific classification
- Kingdom: Animalia
- Phylum: Arthropoda
- Clade: Pancrustacea
- Class: Insecta
- Order: Coleoptera
- Suborder: Adephaga
- Family: Carabidae
- Genus: Blennidus
- Species: B. rectangulus

Binomial name
- Blennidus rectangulus (Straneo, 1993)

Species of beetle

Blennidus rectangulus is a species of ground beetle in the subfamily Pterostichinae. It was described by Straneo in 1993.
