= Blennidus diminutus =

Scientific classification
- Kingdom: Animalia
- Phylum: Arthropoda
- Clade: Pancrustacea
- Class: Insecta
- Order: Coleoptera
- Suborder: Adephaga
- Family: Carabidae
- Genus: Blennidus
- Species: B. diminutus

Binomial name
- Blennidus diminutus (Chaudoir, 1878)

Species of beetle

Blennidus diminutus is a species of ground beetle in the subfamily Pterostichinae. It was described by Maximilien Chaudoir in 1878.
