= Blennidus pichinchae =

Scientific classification
- Kingdom: Animalia
- Phylum: Arthropoda
- Clade: Pancrustacea
- Class: Insecta
- Order: Coleoptera
- Suborder: Adephaga
- Family: Carabidae
- Genus: Blennidus
- Species: B. pichinchae

Binomial name
- Blennidus pichinchae (Bates, 1891)

Species of beetle

Blennidus pichinchae is a species of ground beetle in the subfamily Pterostichinae. It was described by Henry Walter Bates in 1891.
