= Sorotacta bryochlora =

Scientific classification
- Kingdom: Animalia
- Phylum: Arthropoda
- Class: Insecta
- Order: Lepidoptera
- Family: Gelechiidae
- Genus: Sorotacta
- Species: S. bryochlora

Binomial name
- Sorotacta bryochlora Meyrick, 1922

Species of moth

Sorotacta bryochlora is a moth in the family Gelechiidae. It was described by Edward Meyrick in 1922. It is found in Brazil.

The wingspan is about 15 mm. The forewings are rather dark olive green, with the tips of the scales ochreous whitish and with a small ochreous-whitish tuft on the middle of the costa, preceded by a spot of darker suffusion. The stigmata are darker, with the plical beneath the first discal. There is an indistinct shade of ochreous-whitish sprinkles from the costa at three-fourths to the tornus, indented beneath the costa. There are also indistinct darker marginal dots around the posterior part of the costa and termen. The hindwings are dark grey.
