= Apotoforma apatela =

Scientific classification
- Domain: Eukaryota
- Kingdom: Animalia
- Phylum: Arthropoda
- Class: Insecta
- Order: Lepidoptera
- Family: Tortricidae
- Genus: Apotoforma
- Species: A. apatela

Binomial name
- Apotoforma apatela (Walsingham, 1914)

Synonyms
- Tortrix apatela Walsingham, 1914

Species of moth

Apotoforma apatela is a species of moth of the family Tortricidae. It is found in Guatemala.
