= Stenotsivoka caligata =

Scientific classification
- Kingdom: Animalia
- Phylum: Arthropoda
- Clade: Pancrustacea
- Class: Insecta
- Order: Coleoptera
- Suborder: Polyphaga
- Infraorder: Cucujiformia
- Family: Cerambycidae
- Subfamily: Apatophyseinae
- Tribe: Apatophyseini
- Genus: Stenotsivoka
- Species: S. caligata

Binomial name
- Stenotsivoka caligata (Fairmaire, 1904)

Synonyms
- Artelida caligata Fairmaire, 1904

Species of beetle

Stenotsivoka caligata is a species in the longhorn beetle family Cerambycidae. It is found in Madagascar.
