= Apotoforma cydna =

Scientific classification
- Kingdom: Animalia
- Phylum: Arthropoda
- Class: Insecta
- Order: Lepidoptera
- Family: Tortricidae
- Genus: Apotoforma
- Species: A. cydna

Binomial name
- Apotoforma cydna Razowski, 1993

Species of moth

Apotoforma cydna is a species of moth of the family Tortricidae. It is found in Venezuela.

The wingspan is about 15 mm.
