= Blennidus davidsoni =

Scientific classification
- Kingdom: Animalia
- Phylum: Arthropoda
- Clade: Pancrustacea
- Class: Insecta
- Order: Coleoptera
- Suborder: Adephaga
- Family: Carabidae
- Genus: Blennidus
- Species: B. davidsoni

Binomial name
- Blennidus davidsoni (Straneo, 1985)

Species of beetle

Blennidus davidsoni is a species of ground beetle in the subfamily Pterostichinae, described by Stefano Ludovico Straneo in 1985.
