= Carabus lefebvrei lefebvrei =

Scientific classification
- Kingdom: Animalia
- Phylum: Arthropoda
- Class: Insecta
- Order: Coleoptera
- Suborder: Adephaga
- Family: Carabidae
- Genus: Carabus
- Species: C. lefebvrei
- Subspecies: C. l. lefebvrei

Trinomial name
- Carabus lefebvrei lefebvrei Dejean, 1826

Subspecies of beetle

Carabus lefebvrei lefebvrei is a bluish-black-coloured subspecies of ground beetle in the Carabinae subfamily, that can be found in Italy and Sicily.
