= Blennidus blandus =

Scientific classification
- Kingdom: Animalia
- Phylum: Arthropoda
- Clade: Pancrustacea
- Class: Insecta
- Order: Coleoptera
- Suborder: Adephaga
- Family: Carabidae
- Genus: Blennidus
- Species: B. blandus

Binomial name
- Blennidus blandus (Erichson, 1834)

Species of beetle

Blennidus blandus is a species of ground beetle in the subfamily Pterostichinae. It was described by Wilhelm Ferdinand Erichson in 1834.
