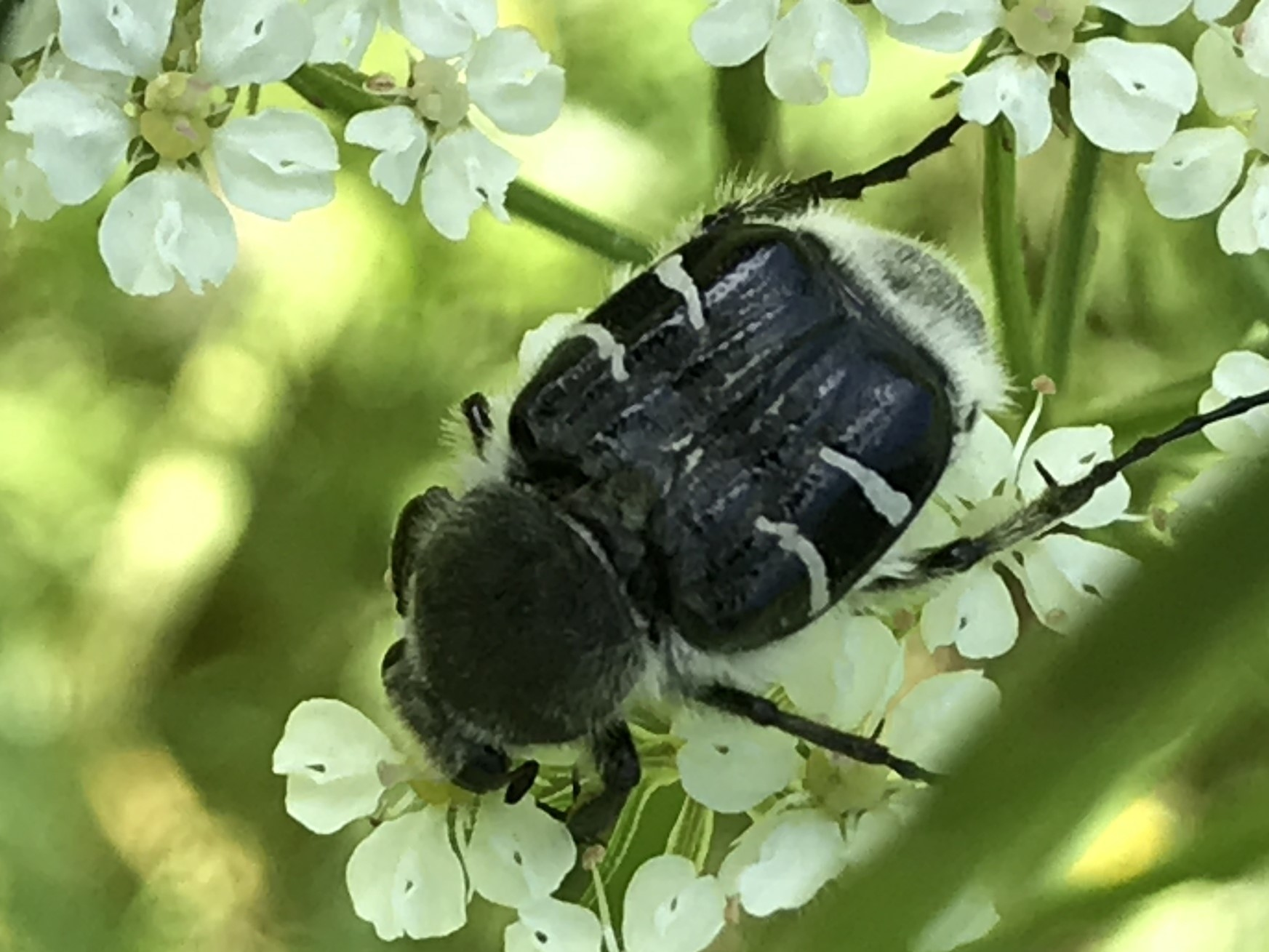

Scientific classification
- Domain: Eukaryota
- Kingdom: Animalia
- Phylum: Arthropoda
- Class: Insecta
- Order: Coleoptera
- Suborder: Polyphaga
- Infraorder: Scarabaeiformia
- Family: Scarabaeidae
- Genus: Trichiotinus
- Species: T. texanus

Binomial name
- Trichiotinus texanus (Horn, 1876)

Synonyms
- Trichiotinus intermedius Casey, 1915; Trichiotinus monticola Casey, 1915

= Trichiotinus texanus =

Texas flower scarab

Species of beetle

Trichiotinus texanus, the Texas flower scarab, is a species of scarab beetle in the family Scarabaeidae.

== Subspecies ==
These two subspecies belong to the species Trichiotinus texanus:

- Trichiotinus texanus monticola Casey, 1915
- Trichiotinus texanus texanus
