= Blennidus leleuporum =

Scientific classification
- Kingdom: Animalia
- Phylum: Arthropoda
- Clade: Pancrustacea
- Class: Insecta
- Order: Coleoptera
- Suborder: Adephaga
- Family: Carabidae
- Genus: Blennidus
- Species: B. leleuporum

Binomial name
- Blennidus leleuporum (Reichardt, 1976)

Species of beetle

Blennidus leleuporum is a species of ground beetle in the subfamily Pterostichinae. It was described by Reichardt in 1976.
