= Blennidus formosus =

Scientific classification
- Kingdom: Animalia
- Phylum: Arthropoda
- Clade: Pancrustacea
- Class: Insecta
- Order: Coleoptera
- Suborder: Adephaga
- Family: Carabidae
- Genus: Blennidus
- Species: B. formosus

Binomial name
- Blennidus formosus Moret, 1995

Species of beetle

Blennidus formosus is a species of ground beetle in the subfamily Pterostichinae. It was described by Moret in 1995.
