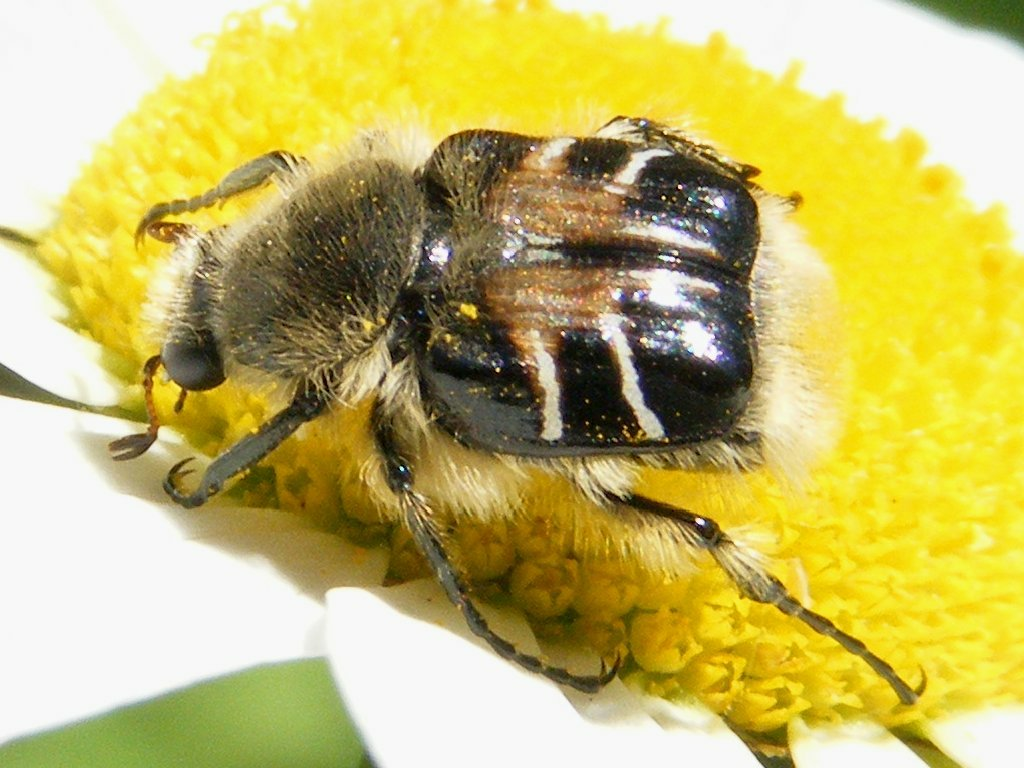
- Trichiotinus affinis

Scientific classification
- Kingdom: Animalia
- Phylum: Arthropoda
- Clade: Pancrustacea
- Class: Insecta
- Order: Coleoptera
- Suborder: Polyphaga
- Infraorder: Scarabaeiformia
- Family: Scarabaeidae
- Tribe: Trichiini
- Genus: Trichiotinus; Casey, 1915

= Trichiotinus =

Genus of beetles

Trichiotinus is a genus of fruit and flower chafers in the family Scarabaeidae. There are about 8 described species in Trichiotinus, all native to the New World.

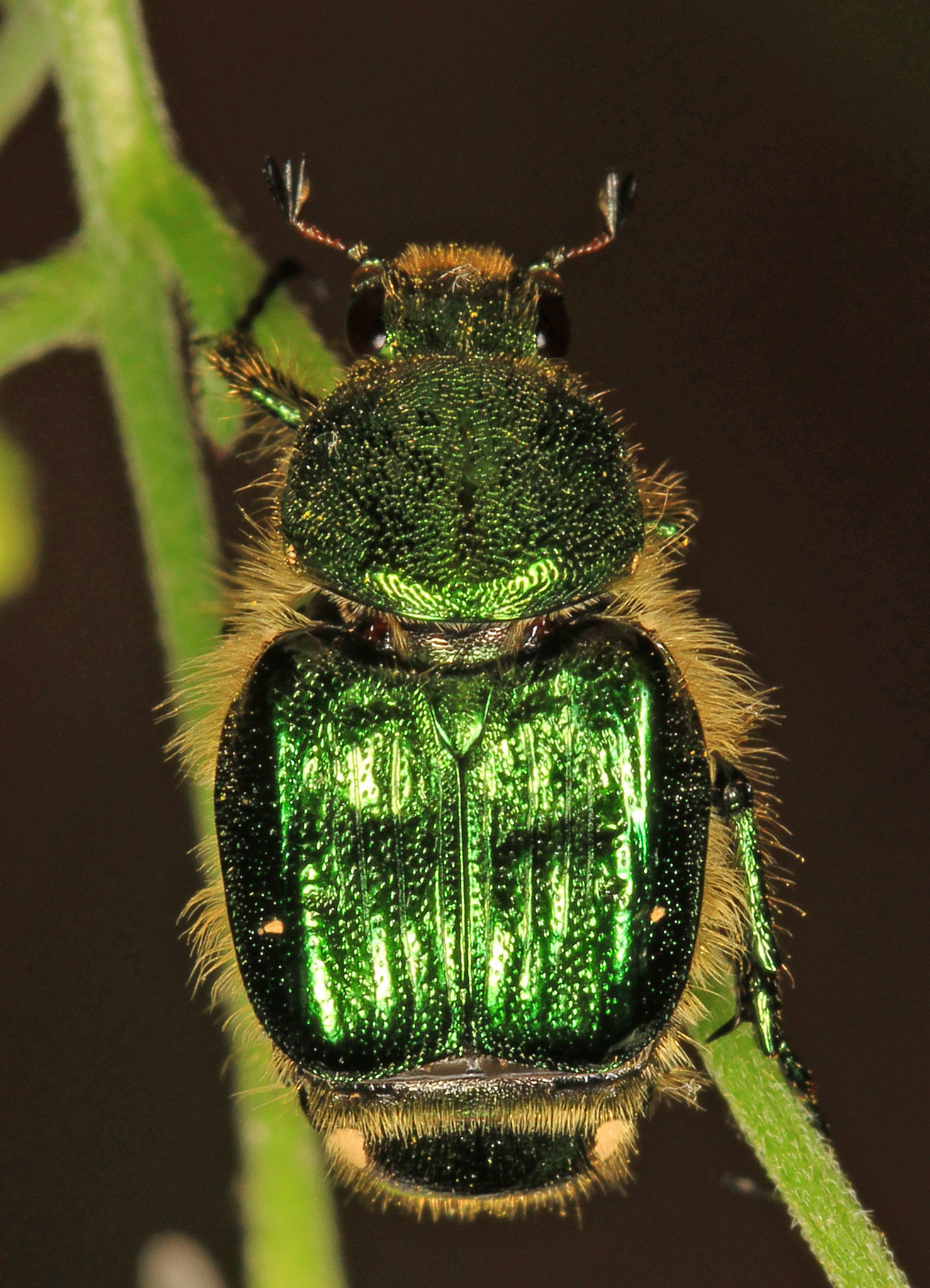
Trichiotinus lunulatus

== Species ==
- Trichiotinus affinis (Gory & Percheron, 1833)
- Trichiotinus assimilis (Kirby, 1837) (hairy flower scarab)
- Trichiotinus bibens (Fabricius, 1775)
- Trichiotinus lunulatus (Fabricius, 1775) (emerald flower scarab)
- Trichiotinus piger (Fabricius, 1775) (bee-like flower scarab)
- Trichiotinus rufobrunneus (Casey, 1914)
- Trichiotinus texanus (Horn, 1876) (Texas flower scarab)
- Trichiotinus viridans (Kirby, 1837)
