= Stenotsivoka scutellaris =

Scientific classification
- Kingdom: Animalia
- Phylum: Arthropoda
- Clade: Pancrustacea
- Class: Insecta
- Order: Coleoptera
- Suborder: Polyphaga
- Infraorder: Cucujiformia
- Family: Cerambycidae
- Subfamily: Apatophyseinae
- Tribe: Apatophyseini
- Genus: Stenotsivoka
- Species: S. scutellaris

Binomial name
- Stenotsivoka scutellaris (Fairmaire, 1896)

Synonyms
- Artelida scutellaris Fairmaire, 1896

Species of beetle

Stenotsivoka scutellaris is a species in the longhorn beetle family Cerambycidae. It is found in Madagascar.
