= Apotoforma =

Scientific classification
- Domain: Eukaryota
- Kingdom: Animalia
- Phylum: Arthropoda
- Class: Insecta
- Order: Lepidoptera
- Family: Tortricidae
- Tribe: Tortricini
- Genus: Apotoforma; Busck, 1934

Synonyms
- Emeralda Diakonoff, 1960

Genus of tortrix moths

Apotoforma is a genus of moths belonging to the subfamily Tortricinae of the family Tortricidae.

== Species ==
- Apotoforma apatela (Walsingham, 1914)
- Apotoforma cimelia (Diakonoff, 1960)
- Apotoforma cydna Razowski, 1993
- Apotoforma dolosa (Walsingham, 1914)
- Apotoforma epacticta Razowski & Becker, 1984 (from Mato Grosso/Brazil)
- Apotoforma fustigera Razowski, 1986
- Apotoforma hodgesi Razowski, 1993
- Apotoforma jamaicana Razowski, 1964
- Apotoforma kakamegae Razowski, 2012
- Apotoforma mayumbeana Razowski, 2012
- Apotoforma monochroma (Walsingham, 1897)
- Apotoforma negans (Walsingham, 1897)
- Apotoforma ptygma Razowski, 1993
- Apotoforma rotundipennis (Walsingham, 1897)
- Apotoforma smaragdina Bippus, 2020 (from Réunion)
- Apotoforma uncifera Razowski, 1964
- Apotoforma viridans Razowski & Becker, 2003

== See also ==
- List of Tortricidae genera
