= Apotoforma cimelia =

Scientific classification
- Domain: Eukaryota
- Kingdom: Animalia
- Phylum: Arthropoda
- Class: Insecta
- Order: Lepidoptera
- Family: Tortricidae
- Genus: Apotoforma
- Species: A. cimelia

Binomial name
- Apotoforma cimelia (Diakonoff, 1960)

Synonyms
- Emeralda cimelia Diakonoff, 1960

Species of moth

Apotoforma cimelia is a species of moth of the family Tortricidae. It is found on Madagascar.
