= Apotoforma uncifera =

Scientific classification
- Kingdom: Animalia
- Phylum: Arthropoda
- Class: Insecta
- Order: Lepidoptera
- Family: Tortricidae
- Genus: Apotoforma
- Species: A. uncifera

Binomial name
- Apotoforma uncifera Razowski, 1964

Species of moth

Apotoforma uncifera is a species of moth of the family Tortricidae. It is found in South Africa.

The wingspan is about 12 mm. The ground colour of the forewings is yellowish, with a brownish pattern.
