= Apotoforma epacticta =

Scientific classification
- Kingdom: Animalia
- Phylum: Arthropoda
- Clade: Pancrustacea
- Class: Insecta
- Order: Lepidoptera
- Family: Tortricidae
- Genus: Apotoforma
- Species: A. epacticta

Binomial name
- Apotoforma epacticta Razowski & Becker, 1984

Species of moth

Apotoforma epacticta is a species of moth of the family Tortricidae. It is found in Brazil (Mato Grosso).

The wingspan is 8–12 mm.
