= Apotoforma fustigera =

Scientific classification
- Kingdom: Animalia
- Phylum: Arthropoda
- Class: Insecta
- Order: Lepidoptera
- Family: Tortricidae
- Genus: Apotoforma
- Species: A. fustigera

Binomial name
- Apotoforma fustigera Razowski, 1986

Species of moth

Apotoforma fustigera is a species of moth of the family Tortricidae. It is found in Cameroon, Ethiopia and Nigeria.
