= Blennidus vereshaginae =

Scientific classification
- Kingdom: Animalia
- Phylum: Arthropoda
- Clade: Pancrustacea
- Class: Insecta
- Order: Coleoptera
- Suborder: Adephaga
- Family: Carabidae
- Genus: Blennidus
- Species: B. vereshaginae

Binomial name
- Blennidus vereshaginae (Straneo, 1993)

Species of beetle

Blennidus vereshaginae is a species of ground beetle in the subfamily Pterostichinae. It was described by Straneo in 1993.
