= Sorotacta =

Scientific classification
- Domain: Eukaryota
- Kingdom: Animalia
- Phylum: Arthropoda
- Class: Insecta
- Order: Lepidoptera
- Family: Gelechiidae
- Subfamily: Gelechiinae
- Genus: Sorotacta; Meyrick, 1914

Genus of moths

Sorotacta is a genus of moth in the family Gelechiidae.

== Species ==
- Sorotacta bryochlora Meyrick, 1922
- Sorotacta viridans Meyrick, 1914
