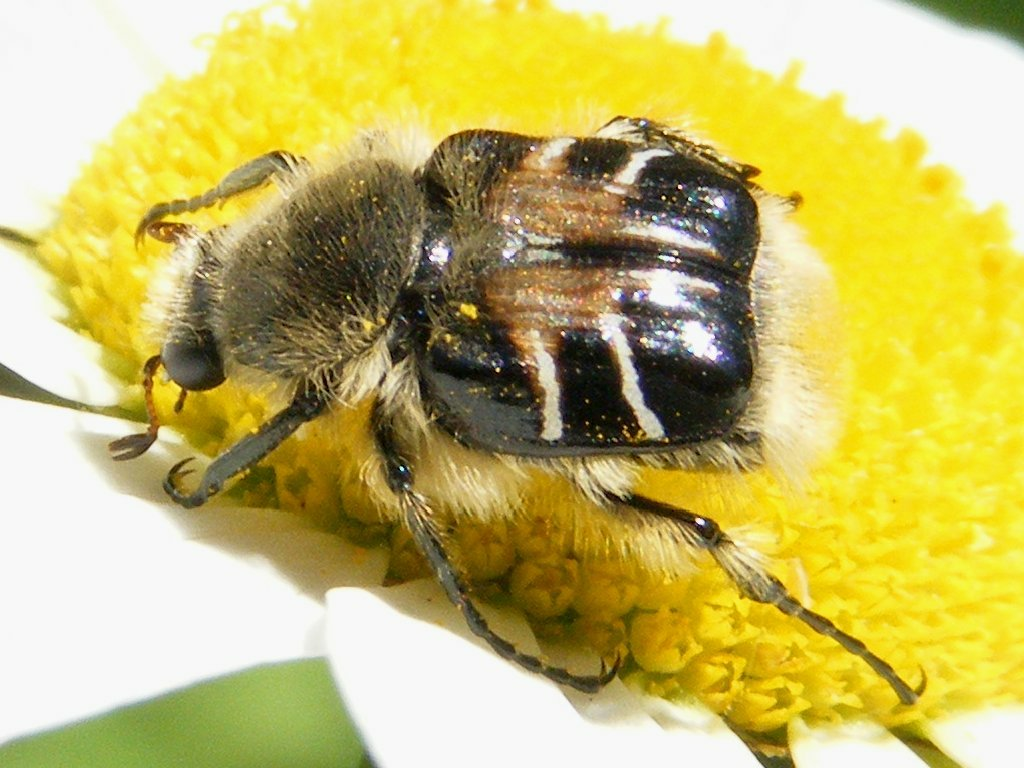

Scientific classification
- Domain: Eukaryota
- Kingdom: Animalia
- Phylum: Arthropoda
- Class: Insecta
- Order: Coleoptera
- Suborder: Polyphaga
- Infraorder: Scarabaeiformia
- Family: Scarabaeidae
- Genus: Trichiotinus
- Species: T. affinis

Binomial name
- Trichiotinus affinis (Gory & Percheron, 1833)

Synonyms
- Trichius mutabilis Schaum, 1844; Trichius parvulus Casey, 1915; Trichius variabilis Burmeister and Schaum, 1841; Trichius venticosus Casey, 1915

= Trichiotinus affinis =

Species of beetle

Trichiotinus affinis is a species of scarab beetle in the family Scarabaeidae. It is found in North America.

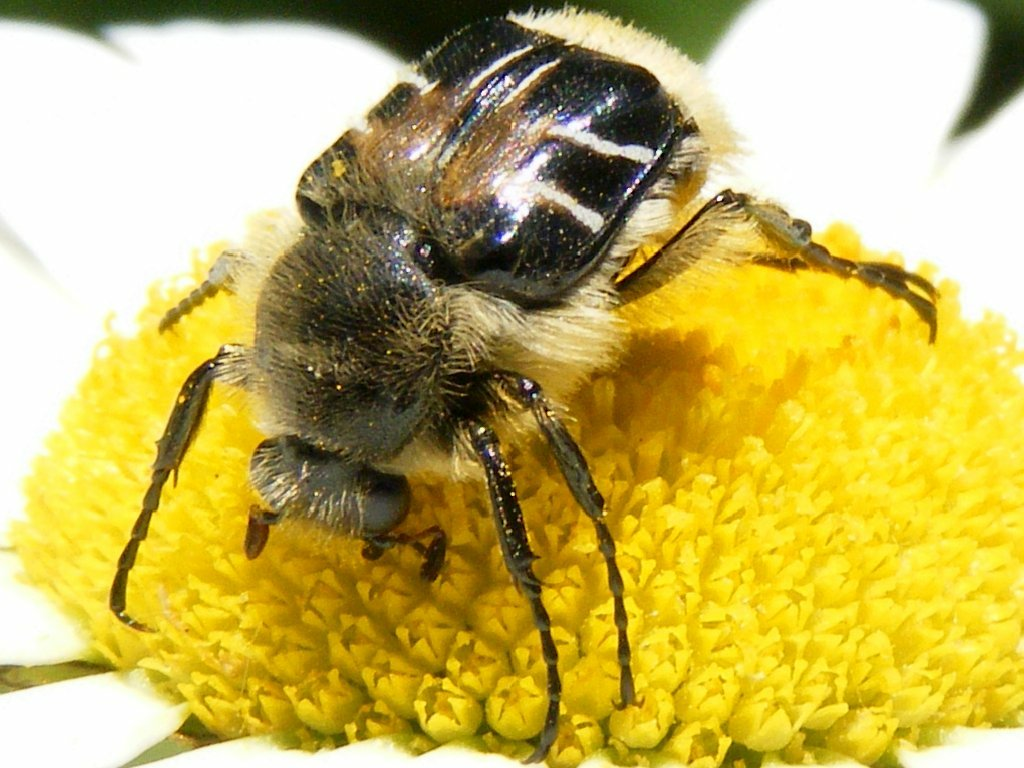

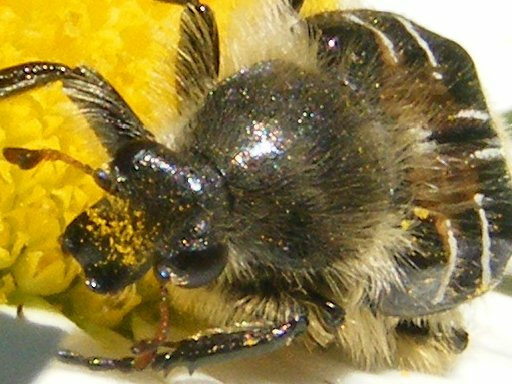
