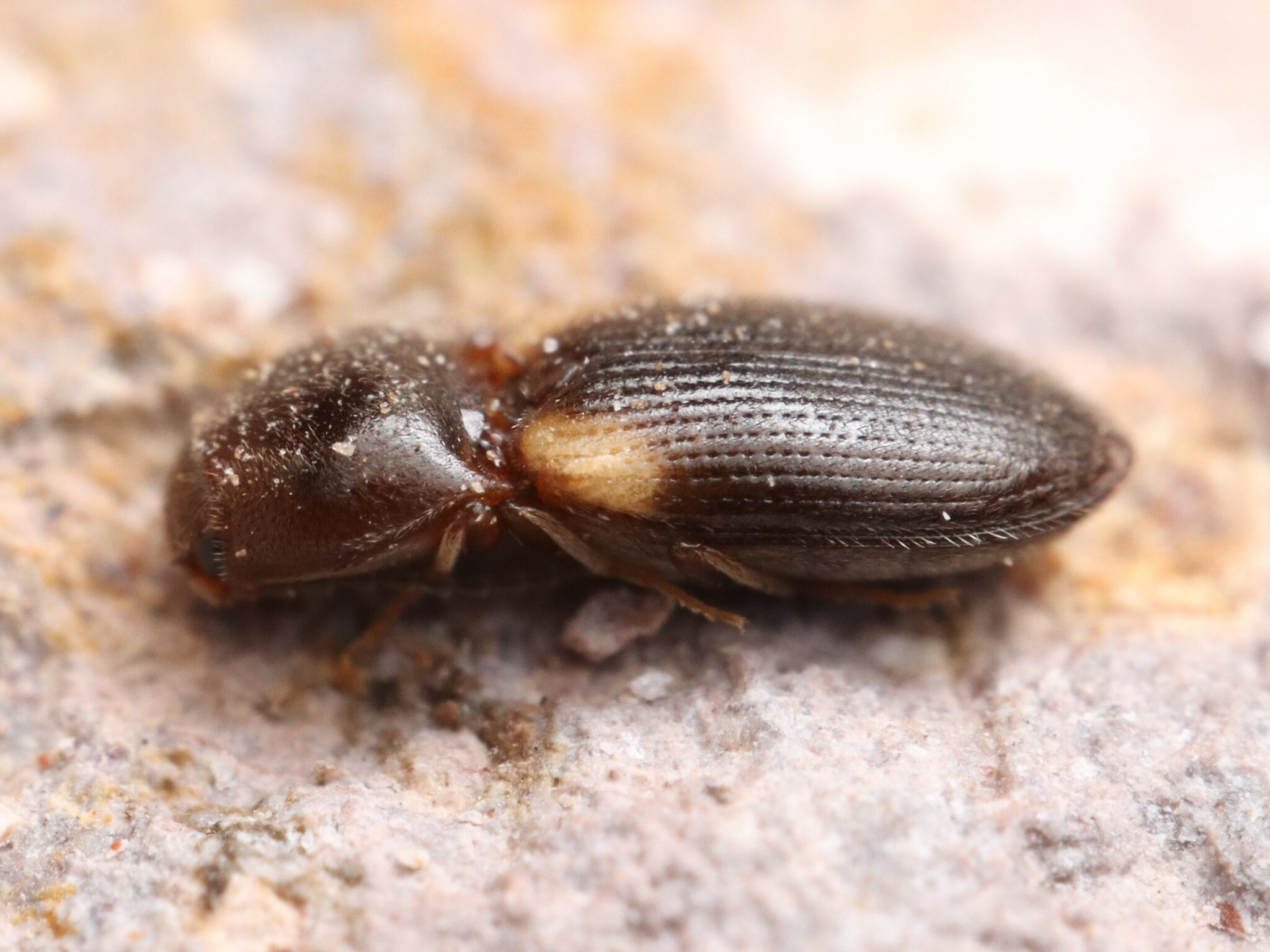
- Austrocardiophorus humeralis, Chile

Scientific classification
- Kingdom: Animalia
- Phylum: Arthropoda
- Class: Insecta
- Order: Coleoptera
- Suborder: Polyphaga
- Infraorder: Elateriformia
- Family: Elateridae
- Tribe: Cardiophorini
- Genus: Austrocardiophorus; Douglas, 2017

= Austrocardiophorus =

Genus of beetles

Austrocardiophorus is a genus of click beetles in the family Elateridae. There are more than 50 described species in Austrocardiophorus.

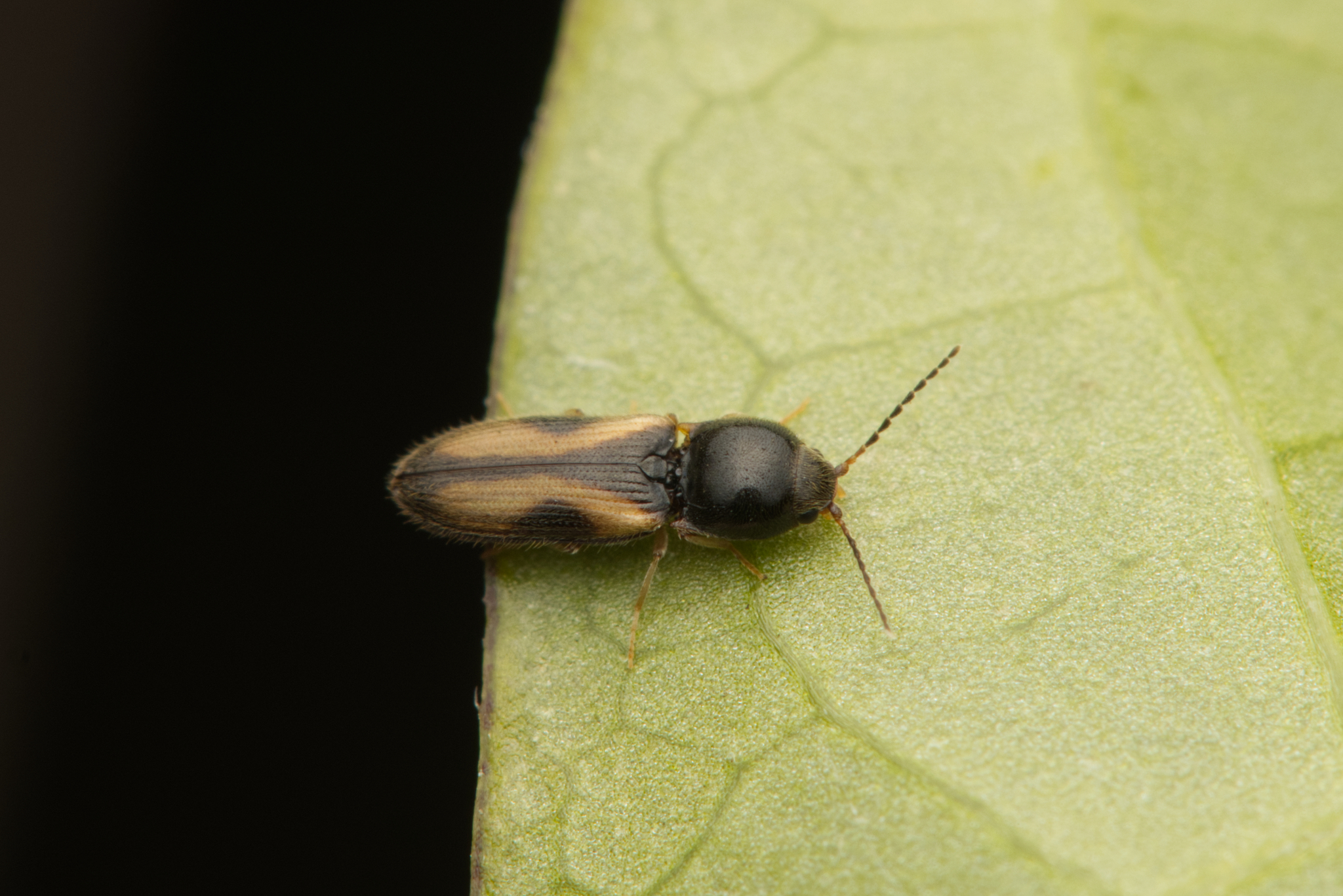
Austrocardiophorus subcruciatus, Australia

This genus was formed from the species of genus Cardiophorus from Australia and Chile were transferred to genus Austrocardiophorus.

== Species ==
These 59 species belong to the genus Austrocardiophorus:

- Austrocardiophorus alternatus (Carter, 1939)
- Austrocardiophorus amabilis (Carter, 1939)
- Austrocardiophorus antennalis (Schwarz, 1907)
- Austrocardiophorus assimilis (Carter, 1939)
- Austrocardiophorus atronotatus (Carter, 1939)
- Austrocardiophorus attenuatipennis (Elston, 1930)
- Austrocardiophorus australis (Candèze, 1860)
- Austrocardiophorus bicolor (Candèze, 1878)
- Austrocardiophorus carissimus (Carter, 1939)
- Austrocardiophorus compactus (Candèze, 1882)
- Austrocardiophorus consobrinus (Candèze, 1878)
- Austrocardiophorus consputus (Candèze, 1878)
- Austrocardiophorus cooki (Carter, 1939)
- Austrocardiophorus delfini (Fleutiaux, 1907)
- Austrocardiophorus despectus (Candèze, 1882)
- Austrocardiophorus dimidiatus (Schwarz, 1902)
- Austrocardiophorus dissimilis (Schwarz, 1903)
- Austrocardiophorus divisus (Candèze, 1865)
- Austrocardiophorus dulcis (Carter, 1939)
- Austrocardiophorus elegans (Solier, 1851)
- Austrocardiophorus elevatus (Van Zwaluwenburg, 1947)
- Austrocardiophorus elisus (Candèze, 1865)
- Austrocardiophorus eucalypti (Blackburn, 1892)
- Austrocardiophorus flavipennis (Candèze, 1878)
- Austrocardiophorus flavopictus (Carter, 1939)
- Austrocardiophorus fulvosignatus (Candèze, 1878)
- Austrocardiophorus hamatus (Candèze, 1878)
- Austrocardiophorus humeralis (Fairmaire & Germain, 1860)
- Austrocardiophorus humilis (Candèze, 1865)
- Austrocardiophorus jugulus (Elston, 1930)
- Austrocardiophorus lenis (Candèze, 1865)
- Austrocardiophorus litoralis (Carter, 1939)
- Austrocardiophorus longicornis (Candèze, 1878)
- Austrocardiophorus macleayi (Schwarz, 1907)
- Austrocardiophorus malkini (Van Zwaluwenburg, 1947)
- Austrocardiophorus mastersii (Macleay, 1872, Elater)
- Austrocardiophorus minimus (Candèze, 1878)
- Austrocardiophorus mjobergi (Elston, 1930)
- Austrocardiophorus moseri (Schwarz, 1902)
- Austrocardiophorus nigrosuffusus (Carter, 1939)
- Austrocardiophorus occidentalis (Carter, 1939)
- Austrocardiophorus octavus (Candèze, 1878)
- Austrocardiophorus octosignatus (Carter, 1939)
- Austrocardiophorus pallidipennis (Candèze, 1878)
- Austrocardiophorus quadripunctatus (Blanchard, 1853)
- Austrocardiophorus quadristellatus (Carter, 1939)
- Austrocardiophorus rufopictus (Carter, 1939)
- Austrocardiophorus sexnotatus (Carter, 1939)
- Austrocardiophorus stellatus (Carter, 1939)
- Austrocardiophorus subcruciatus (Carter, 1939)
- Austrocardiophorus subfasciatus (Carter, 1939)
- Austrocardiophorus tumidithorax (Schwarz, 1907)
- Austrocardiophorus vagus (Schwarz, 1907)
- Austrocardiophorus varians (Carter, 1939)
- Austrocardiophorus variegatus (Schwarz, 1902)
- Austrocardiophorus venustus (Candèze, 1860)
- Austrocardiophorus victoriensis (Blackburn, 1892)
- Austrocardiophorus vittipennis (Carter, 1939)
- Austrocardiophorus xanthomus (Candèze, 1865)
