= Stenotsivoka =

Scientific classification
- Domain: Eukaryota
- Kingdom: Animalia
- Phylum: Arthropoda
- Class: Insecta
- Order: Coleoptera
- Suborder: Polyphaga
- Infraorder: Cucujiformia
- Family: Cerambycidae
- Subfamily: Apatophyseinae
- Tribe: Apatophyseini
- Genus: Stenotsivoka; Adlbauer, 2001

Genus of beetles

Stenotsivoka is a genus in the longhorn beetle family Cerambycidae. There are about seven described species in Stenotsivoka, found in Madagascar.

== Species ==
These seven species belong to the genus Stenotsivoka:

- Stenotsivoka bipunctata Villiers, Quentin & Vives, 2011
- Stenotsivoka caligata (Fairmaire, 1904)
- Stenotsivoka humbloti Villiers, Quentin & Vives, 2011
- Stenotsivoka negrei Vives, 2004
- Stenotsivoka remipes (Fairmaire, 1902)
- Stenotsivoka rubicunda (Fairmaire, 1903)
- Stenotsivoka scutellaris (Fairmaire, 1896)
