= Apotoforma mayumbeana =

Scientific classification
- Kingdom: Animalia
- Phylum: Arthropoda
- Class: Insecta
- Order: Lepidoptera
- Family: Tortricidae
- Genus: Apotoforma
- Species: A. mayumbeana

Binomial name
- Apotoforma mayumbeana Razowski, 2012

Species of moth

Apotoforma mayumbeana is a species of moth of the family Tortricidae that is endemic to the Democratic Republic of the Congo.

The wingspan is about 10 millimetres (0.39 in).
