= Blennidus tardus =

Scientific classification
- Kingdom: Animalia
- Phylum: Arthropoda
- Clade: Pancrustacea
- Class: Insecta
- Order: Coleoptera
- Suborder: Adephaga
- Family: Carabidae
- Genus: Blennidus
- Species: B. tardus

Binomial name
- Blennidus tardus (Tschitscherine, 1898)

Species of beetle

Blennidus tardus is a species of ground beetle in the subfamily Pterostichinae. It was described by Tschitscherine in 1898.
