= Blennidus darlingtoni =

Scientific classification
- Kingdom: Animalia
- Phylum: Arthropoda
- Clade: Pancrustacea
- Class: Insecta
- Order: Coleoptera
- Suborder: Adephaga
- Family: Carabidae
- Genus: Blennidus
- Species: B. darlingtoni

Binomial name
- Blennidus darlingtoni (Straneo, 1951)

Species of beetle

Blennidus darlingtoni is a species of ground beetle in the subfamily Pterostichinae. It was described by Straneo in 1951.
