= Apotoforma ptygma =

Scientific classification
- Kingdom: Animalia
- Phylum: Arthropoda
- Class: Insecta
- Order: Lepidoptera
- Family: Tortricidae
- Genus: Apotoforma
- Species: A. ptygma

Binomial name
- Apotoforma ptygma Razowski, 1993

Species of moth

Apotoforma ptygma is a species of moth of the family Tortricidae. It is found in Mexico (San Luis Potosí).

The wingspan is about 16 mm.
