= Carabus lefebvrei =

Scientific classification
- Kingdom: Animalia
- Phylum: Arthropoda
- Clade: Pancrustacea
- Class: Insecta
- Order: Coleoptera
- Suborder: Adephaga
- Family: Carabidae
- Genus: Carabus
- Species: C. lefebvrei

Binomial name
- Carabus lefebvrei Dejean, 1826

Synonyms
- Carabus intricatus lefebvrei Dejean, 1826

Species of beetle

Carabus lefebvrei is a species of bluish-black coloured ground beetle in the Carabinae subfamily, that is endemic to Sicily.

== Subspecies ==
There are only 2 subspecies:

- Carabus lefebvrei bayardi Solier, 1835
- Carabus lefebvrei lefebvrei Dejean, 1826
