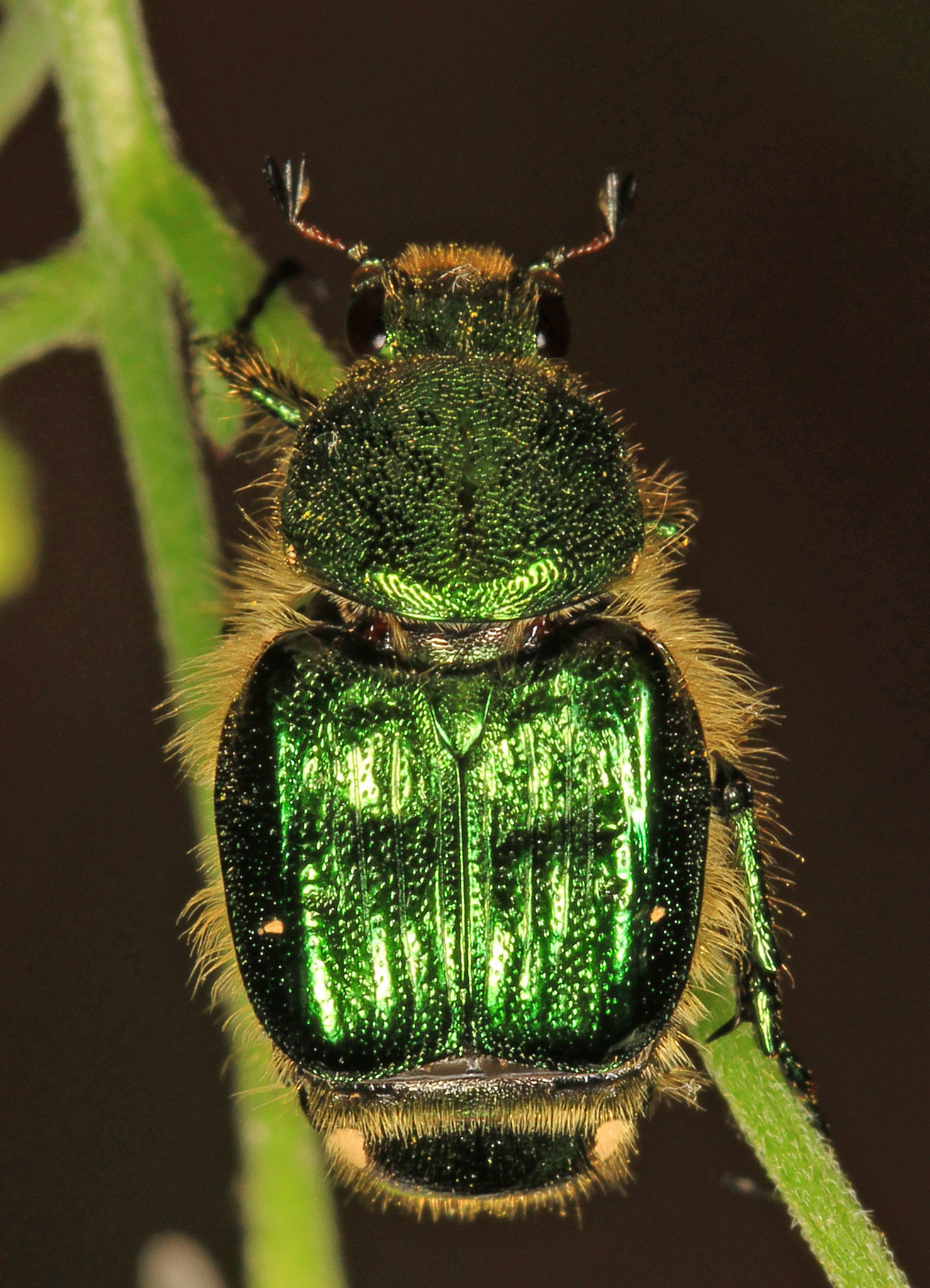

Scientific classification
- Domain: Eukaryota
- Kingdom: Animalia
- Phylum: Arthropoda
- Class: Insecta
- Order: Coleoptera
- Suborder: Polyphaga
- Infraorder: Scarabaeiformia
- Family: Scarabaeidae
- Genus: Trichiotinus
- Species: T. lunulatus

Binomial name
- Trichiotinus lunulatus (Fabricius, 1775)

Synonyms
- Trichius carolinensis Fabricius, 1775; Trichius rasilicaudus Gmelin, 1790; Trichius rufiventris Casey, 1914; Trichius semiviridis Casey, 1914; Trichius virens Casey, 1915; Trichius viridulus Casey, 1915

= Trichiotinus lunulatus =

Species of beetle

Trichiotinus lunulatus, known generally as the emerald flower scarab or metallic green flower scarab, is a species of scarab beetle in the family Scarabaeidae.
