= Blennidus poeciloides =

Scientific classification
- Kingdom: Animalia
- Phylum: Arthropoda
- Clade: Pancrustacea
- Class: Insecta
- Order: Coleoptera
- Suborder: Adephaga
- Family: Carabidae
- Genus: Blennidus
- Species: B. poeciloides

Binomial name
- Blennidus poeciloides (Straneo, 1953)

Species of beetle

Blennidus poeciloides is a species of ground beetle in the subfamily Pterostichinae. It was described by Straneo in 1953.
