= Apotoforma negans =

Scientific classification
- Domain: Eukaryota
- Kingdom: Animalia
- Phylum: Arthropoda
- Class: Insecta
- Order: Lepidoptera
- Family: Tortricidae
- Genus: Apotoforma
- Species: A. negans

Binomial name
- Apotoforma negans (Walsingham, 1897)

Synonyms
- Oxygrapha negans Walsingham, 1897

Species of moth

Apotoforma negans is a species of moth of the family Tortricidae. It is found in Haiti.

The wingspan is about 16 mm. The forewings are olive-grey with a greenish tinge. The costa and termen are shining pale bronzy-brown and there is an oblique series of raised fuscous scales extending from the costa before the middle in a slightly outwardly bowed line towards the middle of the dorsum. This is followed beyond the middle by an ill-defined, scarcely visible, parallel hue of pale brown. The hindwings are umber-brown.
