= Blennidus thoracatus =

Scientific classification
- Kingdom: Animalia
- Phylum: Arthropoda
- Clade: Pancrustacea
- Class: Insecta
- Order: Coleoptera
- Suborder: Adephaga
- Family: Carabidae
- Genus: Blennidus
- Species: B. thoracatus

Binomial name
- Blennidus thoracatus Moret, 2005

Species of beetle

Blennidus thoracatus is a species of ground beetle in the subfamily Pterostichinae. It was described by Moret in 2005.
