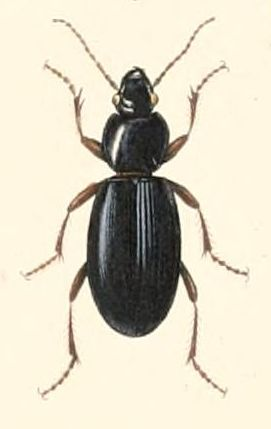
- Blennidus meticulosus

Scientific classification
- Kingdom: Animalia
- Phylum: Arthropoda
- Class: Insecta
- Order: Coleoptera
- Suborder: Adephaga
- Family: Carabidae
- Subfamily: Pterostichinae
- Genus: Blennidus; Motschulsky, 1866

= Blennidus =

Genus of beetles

Blennidus is a genus in the beetle family Carabidae. There are more than 120 described species in Blennidus, found in South America.

== Species ==
These 129 species belong to the genus Blennidus:

- Blennidus abditus Giachino & Allegro, 2011 (Peru)
- Blennidus aberrans (Straneo, 1985) (Colombia)
- Blennidus abramalagae Allegro & Giachino, 2011 (Peru)
- Blennidus amaluzanus Moret, 2005 (Ecuador)
- Blennidus andinus (Straneo, 1991) (Ecuador)
- Blennidus angularis (Straneo, 1985) (Colombia)
- Blennidus antisanae (Bates, 1891) (Ecuador)
- Blennidus anxius (Tschitscherine, 1898) (Peru)
- Blennidus aratus (Solier, 1849) (Chile)
- Blennidus atahualpa Moret, 1996 (Ecuador)
- Blennidus aulacostigma (Tschitscherine, 1897) (Peru)
- Blennidus azurescens Straneo, 1986 (Peru)
- Blennidus balli (Straneo, 1991) (Ecuador)
- Blennidus bellator Moret, 2005 (Ecuador)
- Blennidus bellesi (Straneo, 1993) (Peru)
- Blennidus bistriatus (Straneo, 1951) (Colombia)
- Blennidus blairi (Van Dyke, 1953) (Galapagos)
- Blennidus blandus (Erichson, 1834) (Chile and Uruguay)
- Blennidus bombonensis Allegro & Giachino, 2015 (Peru)
- Blennidus calathoides (G.R.Waterhouse, 1845) (Galapagos)
- Blennidus casalei Moret, 2005 (Ecuador)
- Blennidus catharinianus (Emden, 1949) (Brazil)
- Blennidus chinchillanus Moret, 2005 (Ecuador)
- Blennidus crassus (Straneo, 1993) (Peru)
- Blennidus curtatus (Straneo, 1993) (Peru)
- Blennidus cuzcanus Straneo, 1986 (Peru)
- Blennidus darlingtoni (Straneo, 1951) (Colombia)
- Blennidus davidsoni (Straneo, 1985) (Colombia)
- Blennidus davidsonianus Moret, 2005 (Ecuador)
- Blennidus dianae Camero, 2007 (Colombia)
- Blennidus diminutus (Chaudoir, 1878) (Peru)
- Blennidus dryas Moret, 1995 (Ecuador)
- Blennidus duncani (Van Dyke, 1953) (Galapagos)
- Blennidus ecuadorianus (Straneo, 1991) (Ecuador)
- Blennidus egens (Tschitscherine, 1898) (Peru)
- Blennidus equadoricus (Straneo, 1954) (Ecuador)
- Blennidus etontii Allegro & Giachino, 2011 (Peru)
- Blennidus euphaenops (Tschitscherine, 1898) (Peru)
- Blennidus ferrugineicornis Motschulsky, 1866 (Peru)
- Blennidus fitzcarraldi Giachino & Allegro, 2011 (Peru)
- Blennidus fontainei (Tschitscherine, 1900) (Chile and Ecuador)
- Blennidus formosus Moret, 1995 (Ecuador)
- Blennidus foveatus Straneo, 1951 (Peru)
- Blennidus franzanus (Straneo, 1972) (Peru)
- Blennidus galapagoensis (G.R.Waterhouse, 1845) (Galapagos)
- Blennidus gaujoni Moret, 1995 (Ecuador)
- Blennidus gregarius Moret, 1996 (Ecuador)
- Blennidus hebes (Tschitscherine, 1898) (Chile)
- Blennidus huascarani Allegro, 2010 (Peru)
- Blennidus idioderus (Tschitscherine, 1898) (Peru)
- Blennidus inca (Tschitscherine, 1898) (Peru)
- Blennidus inops (Tschitscherine, 1898) (Chile)
- Blennidus insularis (Boheman, 1858) (Galapagos)
- Blennidus integer (Bates, 1891) (Ecuador)
- Blennidus jelskii (Tschitscherine, 1897) (Peru)
- Blennidus kochalkai (Straneo, 1985) (Colombia)
- Blennidus laevigatus (Straneo, 1951) (Colombia)
- Blennidus laevis (Straneo, 1951) (Peru)
- Blennidus languens (Tschitscherine, 1898) (Peru)
- Blennidus laterestriatus (Chaudoir, 1876) (Argentina)
- Blennidus laurentianus Straneo, 1986 (Peru)
- Blennidus leleuporum (Reichardt, 1976) (Galapagos)
- Blennidus liodes (Bates, 1891) (Ecuador)
- Blennidus longiloba (Straneo, 1993) (Peru)
- Blennidus marlenae Moret, 1995 (Ecuador)
- Blennidus marsyasicus (Straneo, 1951) (Brazil)
- Blennidus mateui (Straneo, 1993) (Peru)
- Blennidus mathani Moret, 1995 (Peru)
- Blennidus mauritii Straneo, 1986 (Peru)
- Blennidus mediolaevis (Chaudoir, 1876) (Chile)
- Blennidus mesotibialis (Straneo, 1993) (Peru)
- Blennidus meticulosus (Dejean, 1831) (Chile)
- Blennidus minutus (Straneo, 1951) (Colombia)
- Blennidus montanus (Straneo, 1951) (Colombia)
- Blennidus mucronatus Moret, 1996 (Ecuador)
- Blennidus mutchleri (Van Dyke, 1953) (Galapagos)
- Blennidus negrei (Straneo, 1993) (Peru)
- Blennidus nemorivagus Moret, 1995 (Ecuador)
- Blennidus nigritulus (Straneo, 1993) (Peru)
- Blennidus obscuripennis (Solier, 1849) (Chile)
- Blennidus olivaceus (Tschitscherine, 1897) (Peru)
- Blennidus onorei (Straneo, 1991) (Ecuador)
- Blennidus orbicollis (Straneo, 1993) (Peru)
- Blennidus pachycerus (Tschitscherine, 1897) (Peru)
- Blennidus parmatus Moret, 1996 (Ecuador)
- Blennidus parvulus (Straneo, 1951) (Colombia)
- Blennidus pascoensis (Straneo, 1954) (Peru)
- Blennidus peruvianus (Dejean, 1828) (Peru)
- Blennidus phaenogonus (Tschitscherine, 1898) (Peru)
- Blennidus pichinchae (Bates, 1891) (Ecuador)
- Blennidus pinguis Allegro & Giachino, 2011 (Peru)
- Blennidus planatus (Straneo, 1972) (Ecuador)
- Blennidus plaumanni (Emden, 1949) (Brazil)
- Blennidus podocarpi Moret, 1995 (Ecuador)
- Blennidus poeciloides (Straneo, 1953) (Bolivia)
- Blennidus poncei (Straneo, 1991) (Ecuador)
- Blennidus procerus Allegro & Giachino, 2011 (Peru)
- Blennidus pseudangularis Allegro & Giachino, 2015 (Peru)
- Blennidus pseudolaevis Allegro & Giachino, 2011 (Peru)
- Blennidus pseudoperuvianus Straneo, 1986 (Peru)
- Blennidus quadrilamatus Straneo, 1986 (Peru)
- Blennidus rectangulus (Straneo, 1993) (Peru)
- Blennidus refleximargo (Straneo, 1993) (Peru)
- Blennidus robustulus (Straneo, 1954) (Peru)
- Blennidus rufescens (Solier, 1849) (Chile)
- Blennidus sanchezi Moret, 2005 (Ecuador)
- Blennidus sciakyi (Straneo, 1991) (Ecuador)
- Blennidus smaragdinus (Straneo, 1951) (Colombia)
- Blennidus solivagus Moret, 2005 (Ecuador)
- Blennidus somnians (Tschitscherine, 1898) (Chile)
- Blennidus straneoi Allegro & Giachino, 2011 (Peru)
- Blennidus strictibasis (Straneo, 1991) (Ecuador)
- Blennidus striolatus (Straneo, 1951) (Colombia)
- Blennidus subcordatus (Straneo, 1951) (Colombia)
- Blennidus sublaevis (Straneo, 1993) (Peru)
- Blennidus sublustris (Tschitscherine, 1898) (Chile)
- Blennidus tardus (Tschitscherine, 1898) (Peru)
- Blennidus tenenbaumi (Lutshnik, 1927) (Peru)
- Blennidus thoracatus Moret, 2005 (Ecuador)
- Blennidus ticlianus (Straneo, 1993) (Peru)
- Blennidus touzeti Moret, 1996 (Ecuador)
- Blennidus uniformis (Straneo, 1951) (Colombia)
- Blennidus unistria (Straneo, 1993) (Peru)
- Blennidus vancuveriensis (Chaudoir, 1878) (Peru)
- Blennidus vereshaginae (Straneo, 1993) (Peru)
- Blennidus vignai Moret, 2005 (Ecuador)
- Blennidus viridans Moret, 1995 (Ecuador)
- Blennidus waterhousei (Van Dyke, 1953) (Galapagos)
- Blennidus williamsi (Van Dyke, 1953) (Galapagos)
