= Blennidus ferrugineicornis =

Scientific classification
- Kingdom: Animalia
- Phylum: Arthropoda
- Clade: Pancrustacea
- Class: Insecta
- Order: Coleoptera
- Suborder: Adephaga
- Family: Carabidae
- Genus: Blennidus
- Species: B. ferrugineicornis

Binomial name
- Blennidus ferrugineicornis Motschulsky, 1866

Species of beetle

Blennidus ferrugineicornis is a species of ground beetle in the subfamily Pterostichinae. It was described by Victor Motschulsky in 1866.
