= Blennidus meticulosus =

Scientific classification
- Kingdom: Animalia
- Phylum: Arthropoda
- Clade: Pancrustacea
- Class: Insecta
- Order: Coleoptera
- Suborder: Adephaga
- Family: Carabidae
- Genus: Blennidus
- Species: B. meticulosus

Binomial name
- Blennidus meticulosus (Dejean, 1831)

Synonyms
- Blennidus bordoni

Species of beetle

Blennidus meticulosus is a species of ground beetle in the subfamily Pterostichinae. It was described by Pierre François Marie Auguste Dejean in 1831.
