= Apotoforma hodgesi =

Scientific classification
- Kingdom: Animalia
- Phylum: Arthropoda
- Class: Insecta
- Order: Lepidoptera
- Family: Tortricidae
- Genus: Apotoforma
- Species: A. hodgesi

Binomial name
- Apotoforma hodgesi Razowski, 1993

Species of moth

Apotoforma hodgesi is a species of moth of the family Tortricidae. It is found in Panama.

The wingspan is about 14 mm.
