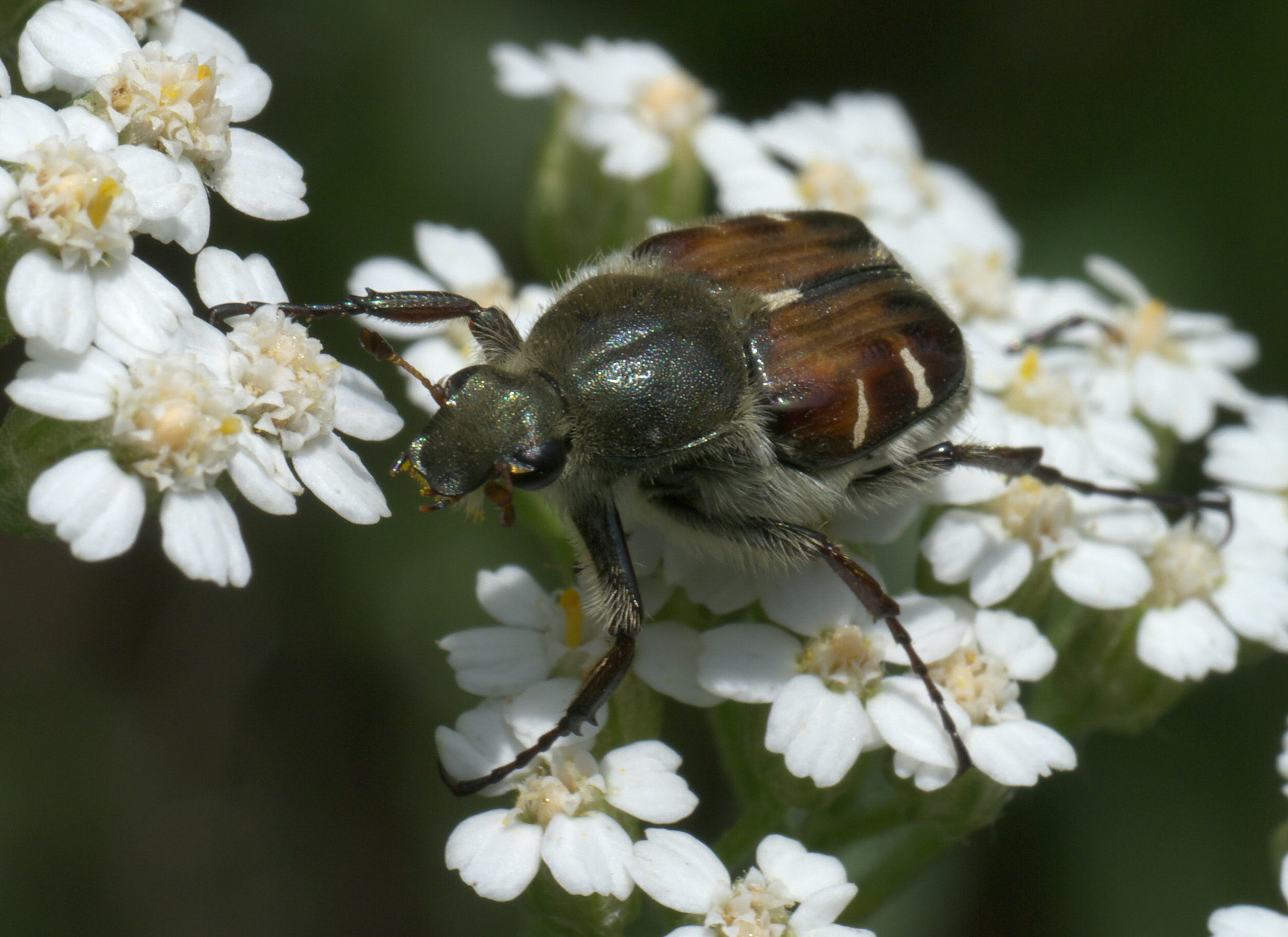

Scientific classification
- Kingdom: Animalia
- Phylum: Arthropoda
- Clade: Pancrustacea
- Class: Insecta
- Order: Coleoptera
- Suborder: Polyphaga
- Infraorder: Scarabaeiformia
- Family: Scarabaeidae
- Genus: Trichiotinus
- Species: T. piger

Binomial name
- Trichiotinus piger Fabricius, 1775

= Trichiotinus piger =

Species of beetle

Trichiotinus piger, the hairy flower chafer or bee-like flower scarab, is a species of beetle in the family Scarabaeidae.

Adult chafers eat the leaves and flowers of many deciduous trees, shrubs and other plants, but rarely cause any serious damage. Chafer beetles also act as pollinators for many species of flowering plants.

Grubs of this species, which reach 40–45 mm long when fully grown, live in the soil and feed on plant roots, especially those of grasses and cereals, and are occasional pests in pastures, nurseries, gardens, and in grassy amenity areas like golf-courses. The grubs can be found immediately below the surface, usually lying in a characteristic comma-like position. The grubs sometimes attack vegetables and other garden plants, such as lettuce, raspberry, strawberry and young ornamental trees. Chafer grubs feed below ground for 3–4 years before changing into adult beetles.
