= Blennidus dianae =

Scientific classification
- Kingdom: Animalia
- Phylum: Arthropoda
- Clade: Pancrustacea
- Class: Insecta
- Order: Coleoptera
- Suborder: Adephaga
- Family: Carabidae
- Genus: Blennidus
- Species: B. dianae

Binomial name
- Blennidus dianae Camero, 2006

Species of beetle

Blennidus dianae is a species of ground beetle in the subfamily Pterostichinae. It was described by Camero in 2006 and is endemic to Colombia where it is found on elevation of 2,620 metres (8,600 ft).
