= Blennidus insularis =

Scientific classification
- Kingdom: Animalia
- Phylum: Arthropoda
- Clade: Pancrustacea
- Class: Insecta
- Order: Coleoptera
- Suborder: Adephaga
- Family: Carabidae
- Genus: Blennidus
- Species: B. insularis

Binomial name
- Blennidus insularis (Boheman, 1858)

Species of beetle

Blennidus insularis is a species of ground beetle in the subfamily Pterostichinae. It was described by Boheman in 1858.
