= Apotoforma rotundipennis =

Scientific classification
- Domain: Eukaryota
- Kingdom: Animalia
- Phylum: Arthropoda
- Class: Insecta
- Order: Lepidoptera
- Family: Tortricidae
- Genus: Apotoforma
- Species: A. rotundipennis

Binomial name
- Apotoforma rotundipennis (Walsingham, 1897)

Synonyms
- Oxygrapha rotundipennis Walsingham, 1897

Species of moth

Apotoforma rotundipennis is a species of moth of the family Tortricidae. It is found on the Virgin Islands.

The wingspan is about 11 mm. The forewings are tawny reddish, with a faintly indicated oblique greyish-fuscous shade from before the middle of the costa, extending to the lower edge of the cell. There is a similar curved shade before the apex and waved lines of sublustrous scales on the outer half of the wing and there is a small black dot at the end of the cell. The hindwings are greyish fuscous.
