= Sorotacta viridans =

Scientific classification
- Domain: Eukaryota
- Kingdom: Animalia
- Phylum: Arthropoda
- Class: Insecta
- Order: Lepidoptera
- Family: Gelechiidae
- Genus: Sorotacta
- Species: S. viridans

Binomial name
- Sorotacta viridans Meyrick, 1914

Species of moth

Sorotacta viridans is a moth in the family Gelechiidae. It was described by Edward Meyrick in 1914. It is found in Guyana.

The wingspan is 11–12 mm. The forewings are light dull green, finely sprinkled with whitish and with a small blackish spot on the base of the costa, and a black subbasal dot in the middle. There are small wedge-shaped black spots on the costa at one-fifth, before the middle, and two-thirds, suffused beneath with deep olive green and edged posteriorly with whitish. The discal stigmata are blackish, raised and somewhat whitish edged, the first rather large, the second forming the apex of an irregular dark grey whitish-edged pre-tornal blotch. The plical stigma is represented by a greenish tuft, obliquely before the first discal, preceded by a small blackish dot. There is an indistinct whitish line from beyond the third costal spot to the tornus, obtusely angulated in the middle and there are two blackish dots on the costa towards the apex and termen beneath the apex, and some grey-whitish suffusion along the margin. The hindwings are dark grey.
