= Apotoforma viridans =

Scientific classification
- Kingdom: Animalia
- Phylum: Arthropoda
- Clade: Pancrustacea
- Class: Insecta
- Order: Lepidoptera
- Family: Tortricidae
- Genus: Apotoforma
- Species: A. viridans

Binomial name
- Apotoforma viridans Razowski & Becker, 2003

Species of moth

Apotoforma viridans is a species of moth of the family Tortricidae. It is found in Brazil (Rondonia).
