= Trichiotinus viridans =

Scientific classification
- Domain: Eukaryota
- Kingdom: Animalia
- Phylum: Arthropoda
- Class: Insecta
- Order: Coleoptera
- Suborder: Polyphaga
- Infraorder: Scarabaeiformia
- Family: Scarabaeidae
- Genus: Trichiotinus
- Species: T. viridans

Binomial name
- Trichiotinus viridans (Kirby, 1837)

Species of beetle

Trichiotinus viridans is a species in the family Scarabaeidae ("scarab beetles"), in the order Coleoptera ("beetles").
