= Antoine Joseph Jean Solier =

Antoine Joseph Jean Solier (8 February 1792, in Marseille – 27 November 1851, in Marseille) was a French naturalist, entomologist and plant collector.

Captain of engineers in the French army, he made collections in France, Algeria and the Mediterranean area and on an expedition to Oceania especially of Coleoptera. Solier worked on world beetle fauna writing many scientific papers and Orden III. Coleopteros.

His collections, especially important for Tenebrionidae, are in the Muséum national d'histoire naturelle. He was a Member of the Société entomologique de France.
