= Mastododera fallaciosa =

Scientific classification
- Kingdom: Animalia
- Phylum: Arthropoda
- Clade: Pancrustacea
- Class: Insecta
- Order: Coleoptera
- Suborder: Polyphaga
- Infraorder: Cucujiformia
- Family: Cerambycidae
- Genus: Mastododera
- Species: M. fallaciosa

Binomial name
- Mastododera fallaciosa Villiers, 1982

Species of beetle

Mastododera fallaciosa is a species in the Lepturinae subfamily within the long-horned beetle family. This beetle is found on the island of Madagascar.
