= Mimorsidis yayeyamensis =

Scientific classification
- Kingdom: Animalia
- Phylum: Arthropoda
- Class: Insecta
- Order: Coleoptera
- Suborder: Polyphaga
- Infraorder: Cucujiformia
- Family: Cerambycidae
- Genus: Mimorsidis
- Species: M. yayeyamensis

Binomial name
- Mimorsidis yayeyamensis Breuning & Villiers, 1973

Species of beetle

Mimorsidis yayeyamensis is a species of beetle in the family Cerambycidae. It was described by Stephan von Breuning and Villiers in 1973.
