= Mastododera velutina =

Scientific classification
- Kingdom: Animalia
- Phylum: Arthropoda
- Clade: Pancrustacea
- Class: Insecta
- Order: Coleoptera
- Suborder: Polyphaga
- Infraorder: Cucujiformia
- Family: Cerambycidae
- Genus: Mastododera
- Species: M. velutina

Binomial name
- Mastododera velutina Villiers, 1982

Species of beetle

Mastododera velutina is a species of beetle in the family Cerambycidae. It was described by Villiers in 1982. And is found in Madagascar
