= Dessumia =

Scientific classification
- Kingdom: Animalia
- Phylum: Arthropoda
- Class: Insecta
- Order: Coleoptera
- Suborder: Polyphaga
- Infraorder: Elateriformia
- Family: Buprestidae
- Genus: Dessumia; Descarpentries & Villiers, 1966

Genus of beetles

Dessumia is a genus of beetles in the family Buprestidae, containing the following species:

- Dessumia atrata (Bourgoin, 1922)
- Dessumia vitalisi (Bourgoin, 1922)
