= Sybra trianguliferoides =

Scientific classification
- Kingdom: Animalia
- Phylum: Arthropoda
- Class: Insecta
- Order: Coleoptera
- Suborder: Polyphaga
- Infraorder: Cucujiformia
- Family: Cerambycidae
- Genus: Sybra
- Species: S. trianguliferoides

Binomial name
- Sybra trianguliferoides Breuning & Villiers, 1983

Species of beetle

Sybra trianguliferoides is a species of beetle in the family Cerambycidae. It was described by Stephan von Breuning and Villiers in 1983.
