= Fortuneleptura =

Scientific classification
- Kingdom: Animalia
- Phylum: Arthropoda
- Class: Insecta
- Order: Coleoptera
- Suborder: Polyphaga
- Infraorder: Cucujiformia
- Family: Cerambycidae
- Subfamily: Lepturinae
- Tribe: Lepturini
- Genus: Fortuneleptura; Villiers, 1979

Genus of beetles

Fortuneleptura is a genus of beetles in the family Cerambycidae, containing the following species:

- Fortuneleptura cameneni Villiers, 1979
- Fortuneleptura romei Touroult, 2011
