= Boppeus =

Scientific classification
- Kingdom: Animalia
- Phylum: Arthropoda
- Class: Insecta
- Order: Coleoptera
- Suborder: Polyphaga
- Infraorder: Cucujiformia
- Family: Cerambycidae
- Subfamily: Dorcasominae
- Genus: Boppeus; Villiers, 1982

Genus of beetles

Boppeus is a genus in the longhorn beetle family Cerambycidae. There are about 10 described species in Boppeus, found in Madagascar.

== Species ==
These 10 species belong to the genus Boppeus:

- Boppeus acuticollis Villiers, 1982
- Boppeus brevicollis Villiers, 1982
- Boppeus fairmairei (Boppe, 1921)
- Boppeus laevis Villiers, 1982
- Boppeus lagrioides Villiers, 1982
- Boppeus orientalis Villiers, 1982
- Boppeus pauliani Villiers, 1982
- Boppeus peyrierasi Vives, 2004
- Boppeus sericeus Villiers, 1982
- Boppeus viettei Villiers, 1982
