= Boppeus laevis =

Scientific classification
- Kingdom: Animalia
- Phylum: Arthropoda
- Class: Insecta
- Order: Coleoptera
- Suborder: Polyphaga
- Infraorder: Cucujiformia
- Family: Cerambycidae
- Genus: Boppeus
- Species: B. laevis

Binomial name
- Boppeus laevis Villiers, 1982

Species of beetle

Boppeus laevis is a species of beetle in the family Cerambycidae. It was described by Villiers in 1982.
