= Neseuterpia curvipes =

Scientific classification
- Kingdom: Animalia
- Phylum: Arthropoda
- Class: Insecta
- Order: Coleoptera
- Suborder: Polyphaga
- Infraorder: Cucujiformia
- Family: Cerambycidae
- Genus: Neseuterpia
- Species: N. curvipes

Binomial name
- Neseuterpia curvipes Villiers, 1980

Species of beetle

Neseuterpia curvipes is a species of beetle in the family Cerambycidae. It was described by Villiers in 1980.
