= Eunidia naviauxi =

Scientific classification
- Kingdom: Animalia
- Phylum: Arthropoda
- Clade: Pancrustacea
- Class: Insecta
- Order: Coleoptera
- Suborder: Polyphaga
- Infraorder: Cucujiformia
- Family: Cerambycidae
- Genus: Eunidia
- Species: E. naviauxi

Binomial name
- Eunidia naviauxi Villiers, 1977

Synonyms
- Eunidia djiboutiana Breuning, 1974; Eunidia naviauxi Villiers, 1977; Eunidia renaudi Breuning, 1961; Eunidia submarmorata Breuning, 1968

Species of beetle

Eunidia naviauxi is a species of beetle in the family Cerambycidae. It was described by Villiers in 1977. It is known from Saudi Arabia, Djibouti, Yemen, Egypt, Chad, Oman, Niger, and Senegal.
