= Hyllisia albolineatipennis =

Scientific classification
- Kingdom: Animalia
- Phylum: Arthropoda
- Class: Insecta
- Order: Coleoptera
- Suborder: Polyphaga
- Infraorder: Cucujiformia
- Family: Cerambycidae
- Genus: Hyllisia
- Species: H. albolineatipennis

Binomial name
- Hyllisia albolineatipennis Breuning & Villiers, 1972

Species of beetle

Hyllisia albolineatipennis is a species of beetle in the family Cerambycidae. It was described by Stephan von Breuning and Villiers in 1972.
