= Dorcadion zanteanum =

Scientific classification
- Kingdom: Animalia
- Phylum: Arthropoda
- Clade: Pancrustacea
- Class: Insecta
- Order: Coleoptera
- Suborder: Polyphaga
- Infraorder: Cucujiformia
- Family: Cerambycidae
- Genus: Dorcadion
- Species: D. zanteanum

Binomial name
- Dorcadion zanteanum Breuning & Villiers, 1967

Species of beetle

Dorcadion zanteanum is a species of beetle in the family Cerambycidae. It was described by Stephan von Breuning and Villiers in 1967.
