= Hippopsicon montanum =

Scientific classification
- Kingdom: Animalia
- Phylum: Arthropoda
- Class: Insecta
- Order: Coleoptera
- Suborder: Polyphaga
- Infraorder: Cucujiformia
- Family: Cerambycidae
- Genus: Hippopsicon
- Species: H. montanum

Binomial name
- Hippopsicon montanum Quentin & Villiers, 1981

Species of beetle

Hippopsicon montanum is a species of beetle in the family Cerambycidae. It was described by Quentin and Villiers in 1981.
