= Paroecus charpentierae =

Scientific classification
- Kingdom: Animalia
- Phylum: Arthropoda
- Class: Insecta
- Order: Coleoptera
- Suborder: Polyphaga
- Infraorder: Cucujiformia
- Family: Cerambycidae
- Genus: Paroecus
- Species: P. charpentierae

Binomial name
- Paroecus charpentierae Villiers, 1971

Species of beetle

Paroecus charpentierae is a species of beetle in the family Cerambycidae. It was described by Villiers in 1971.
