= Oedopeza fleutiauxi =

Scientific classification
- Kingdom: Animalia
- Phylum: Arthropoda
- Class: Insecta
- Order: Coleoptera
- Suborder: Polyphaga
- Infraorder: Cucujiformia
- Family: Cerambycidae
- Genus: Oedopeza
- Species: O. fleutiauxi

Binomial name
- Oedopeza fleutiauxi (Villiers, 1980)

Species of beetle

Oedopeza fleutiauxi is a species of beetle in the family Cerambycidae. It was described by Villiers in 1980.
