= Phytoecia iraniensis =

Scientific classification
- Kingdom: Animalia
- Phylum: Arthropoda
- Class: Insecta
- Order: Coleoptera
- Suborder: Polyphaga
- Infraorder: Cucujiformia
- Family: Cerambycidae
- Genus: Phytoecia
- Species: P. iraniensis

Binomial name
- Phytoecia iraniensis Breuning & Villiers, 1972

Synonyms
- Mimocoptosia iraniensis Sama, 2005

Species of beetle

Phytoecia iraniensis is a species of beetle in the family Cerambycidae. It was described by Stephan von Breuning and Villiers in 1972. It is known from Iran.
