= Dorcadion rizeanum =

Scientific classification
- Kingdom: Animalia
- Phylum: Arthropoda
- Clade: Pancrustacea
- Class: Insecta
- Order: Coleoptera
- Suborder: Polyphaga
- Infraorder: Cucujiformia
- Family: Cerambycidae
- Genus: Dorcadion
- Species: D. rizeanum

Binomial name
- Dorcadion rizeanum (Breuning & Villiers, 1967)

Species of beetle

Dorcadion rizeanum is a species of beetle in the family Cerambycidae. It was described by Stephan von Breuning and Villiers in 1967.
