= Hyllisia saigonensis =

Scientific classification
- Kingdom: Animalia
- Phylum: Arthropoda
- Class: Insecta
- Order: Coleoptera
- Suborder: Polyphaga
- Infraorder: Cucujiformia
- Family: Cerambycidae
- Genus: Hyllisia
- Species: H. saigonensis

Binomial name
- Hyllisia saigonensis (Pic, 1933)

Species of beetle

Hyllisia saigonensis is a species of beetle in the family Cerambycidae. It was described by Maurice Pic in 1933.
