= Hyllisia =

Scientific classification
- Kingdom: Animalia
- Phylum: Arthropoda
- Class: Insecta
- Order: Coleoptera
- Suborder: Polyphaga
- Infraorder: Cucujiformia
- Family: Cerambycidae
- Subfamily: Lamiinae
- Tribe: Agapanthiini
- Genus: Hyllisia; Pascoe, 1864

Genus of beetles

Hyllisia is a genus of beetles in the family Cerambycidae, containing the following species:

subgenus Hyllisia

- Hyllisia abyssinica Téocchi, Jiroux & Sudre, 2004
- Hyllisia aethiopica Breuning, 1974
- Hyllisia albifrons Breuning, 1955
- Hyllisia albocincta (Pic, 1924)
- Hyllisia albolateralis Breuning, 1950
- Hyllisia albolineata Breuning, 1940
- Hyllisia albolineatipennis Breuning & Villiers, 1972
- Hyllisia albostictica Breuning, 1955
- Hyllisia angustata (Pic, 1926)
- Hyllisia antennata (Fabricius, 1801)
- Hyllisia conradti Breuning, 1961
- Hyllisia consimilis Gahan, 1895
- Hyllisia damarensis Breuning, 1948
- Hyllisia delicatula Heller, 1924
- Hyllisia densepunctata Breuning, 1940
- Hyllisia flava Breuning, 1950
- Hyllisia flavicans Breuning, 1954
- Hyllisia flavomarmorata Breuning, 1940
- Hyllisia flavostictica Breuning, 1976
- Hyllisia flavovittata Breuning, 1961
- Hyllisia imitans Duvivier, 1892
- Hyllisia indica Breuning, 1947
- Hyllisia insetosa Breuning, 1955
- Hyllisia javanica Breuning, 1948
- Hyllisia kenyensis Breuning, 1948
- Hyllisia koui Breuning, 1962
- Hyllisia laterialba Breuning, 1981
- Hyllisia leucosuturata Hunt & Breuning, 1957
- Hyllisia lineata Gahan, 1894
- Hyllisia lineatopicta Breuning, 1954
- Hyllisia loloa Jordan, 1903
- Hyllisia minor Breuning, 1964
- Hyllisia multigriseovittata Báguena & Breuning, 1958
- Hyllisia multilineata Breuning, 1940
- Hyllisia niveovittata Aurivillius, 1910
- Hyllisia obliquepicta Breuning, 1940
- Hyllisia occidentalis Breuning, 1964
- Hyllisia ochreovittata Breuning, 1940
- Hyllisia ochreovittipennis Breuning, 1977
- Hyllisia oshimana Breuning, 1955
- Hyllisia persimilis Breuning, 1940
- Hyllisia picta Breuning, 1940
- Hyllisia pseudolineata Breuning, 1942
- Hyllisia quadricollis Fairmaire, 1871
- Hyllisia quadriflavicollis Breuning, 1957
- Hyllisia quinquelineata Breuning, 1948
- Hyllisia ruficolor (Pic, 1934)
- Hyllisia rufipes (Pic, 1934)
- Hyllisia saigonensis (Pic, 1933)
- Hyllisia shembaganurensis Breuning, 1982
- Hyllisia somaliensis Breuning, 1972
- Hyllisia stenideoides Pascoe, 1864
- Hyllisia strandi Breuning, 1940
- Hyllisia subvariegata Breuning, 1953
- Hyllisia subvittipennis Breuning & Ohbayashi, 1966
- Hyllisia sumatrana Breuning, 1940
- Hyllisia suturalis Aurivillius, 1920
- Hyllisia suturaloides Breuning, 1981
- Hyllisia taihokensis (Matsushita, 1933)
- Hyllisia tonkinea (Fairmaire, 1888)
- Hyllisia tonkinensis Breuning, 1948
- Hyllisia triguttata Aurivillius, 1914
- Hyllisia trivittata Breuning, 1940
- Hyllisia truncata Breuning, 1956
- Hyllisia unicoloricornis Breuning, 1954
- Hyllisia uniformis Breuning, 1972
- Hyllisia variegata Aurivillius, 1907
- Hyllisia vicina Breuning, 1982
- Hyllisia virgata Gerstaecker, 1871
- Hyllisia vittipennis Breuning, 1940

subgenus Madecassohyllisia

- Hyllisia madecassa Breuning, 1948
