= Hyllisia ochreovittata =

Scientific classification
- Kingdom: Animalia
- Phylum: Arthropoda
- Class: Insecta
- Order: Coleoptera
- Suborder: Polyphaga
- Infraorder: Cucujiformia
- Family: Cerambycidae
- Genus: Hyllisia
- Species: H. ochreovittata

Binomial name
- Hyllisia ochreovittata Breuning, 1940

Species of beetle

Hyllisia ochreovittata is a species of beetle in the family Cerambycidae. It was described by Breuning in 1940.
