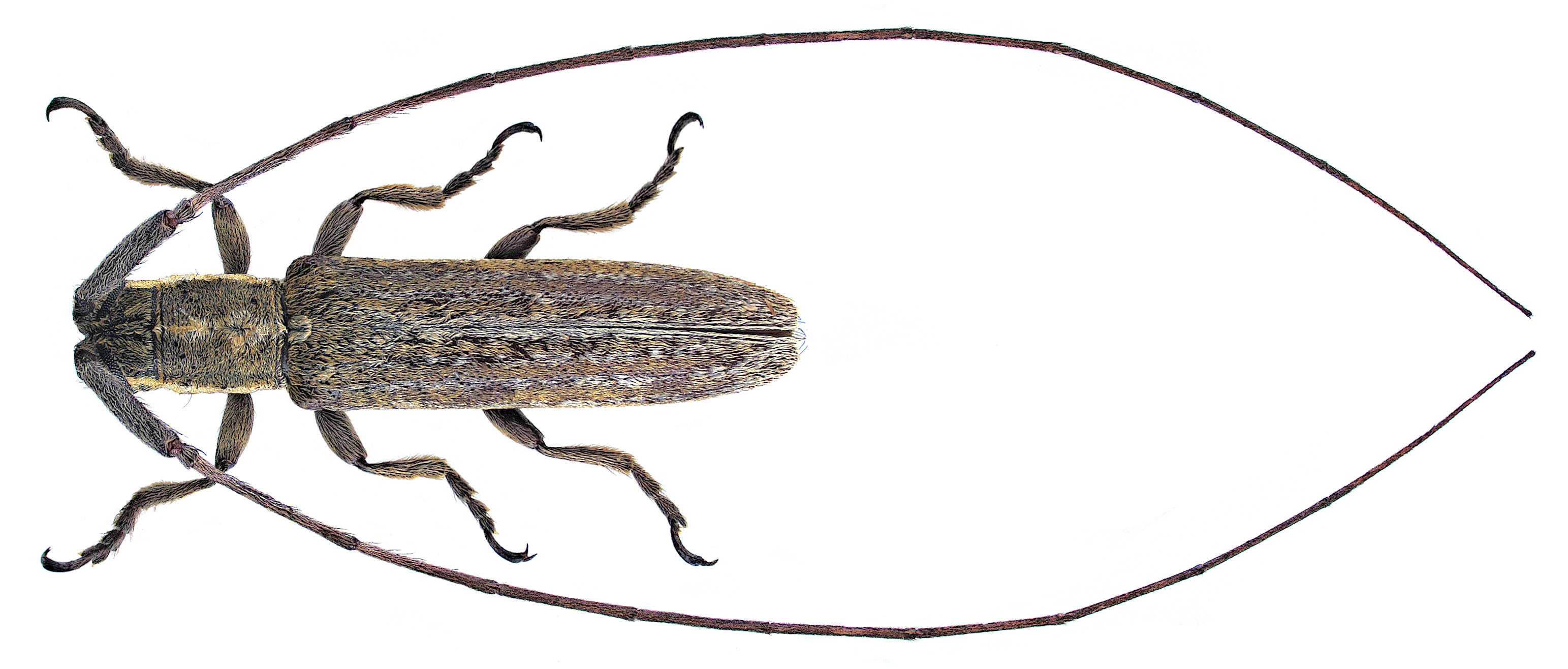

Scientific classification
- Kingdom: Animalia
- Phylum: Arthropoda
- Class: Insecta
- Order: Coleoptera
- Suborder: Polyphaga
- Infraorder: Cucujiformia
- Family: Cerambycidae
- Genus: Hyllisia
- Species: H. suturalis

Binomial name
- Hyllisia suturalis Aurivillius, 1920

= Hyllisia suturalis =

Species of beetle

Hyllisia suturalis is a species of beetle in the family Cerambycidae. It was described by Per Olof Christopher Aurivillius in 1920.
