= Hippopsicon simile =

Scientific classification
- Kingdom: Animalia
- Phylum: Arthropoda
- Class: Insecta
- Order: Coleoptera
- Suborder: Polyphaga
- Infraorder: Cucujiformia
- Family: Cerambycidae
- Genus: Hippopsicon
- Species: H. simile

Binomial name
- Hippopsicon simile Breuning, 1956

Species of beetle

Hippopsicon simile is a species of beetle in the family Cerambycidae. It was described by Breuning in 1956.
