= Hyllisia subvittipennis =

Scientific classification
- Kingdom: Animalia
- Phylum: Arthropoda
- Class: Insecta
- Order: Coleoptera
- Suborder: Polyphaga
- Infraorder: Cucujiformia
- Family: Cerambycidae
- Genus: Hyllisia
- Species: H. subvittipennis

Binomial name
- Hyllisia subvittipennis Breuning & Ohbayashi, 1966

Species of beetle

Hyllisia subvittipennis is a species of beetle in the family Cerambycidae. It was described by Stephan von Breuning and Ohbayashi in 1966.
