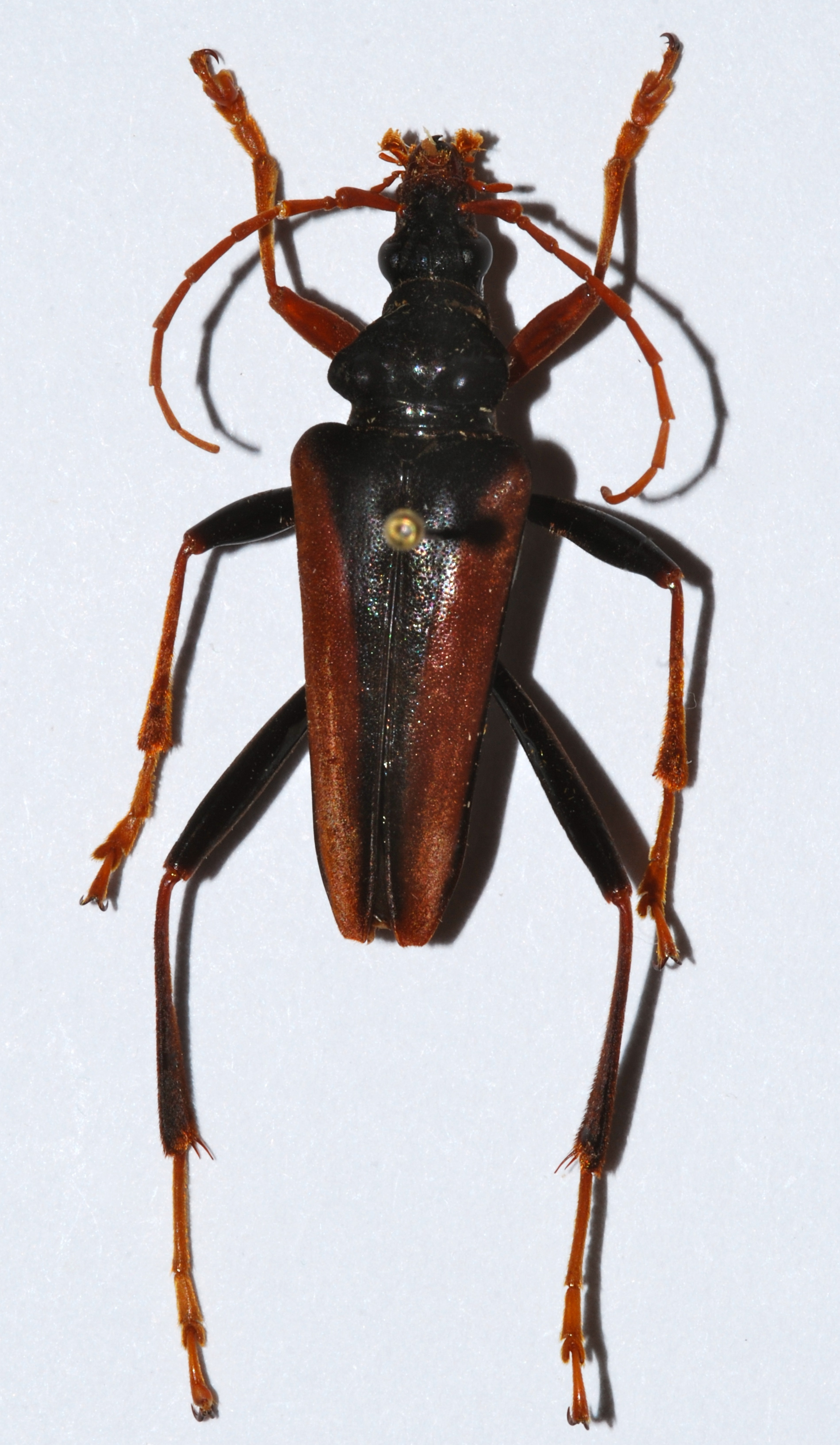
- Mastododera lateralis

Scientific classification
- Domain: Eukaryota
- Kingdom: Animalia
- Phylum: Arthropoda
- Class: Insecta
- Order: Coleoptera
- Suborder: Polyphaga
- Infraorder: Cucujiformia
- Family: Cerambycidae
- Subfamily: Dorcasominae
- Genus: Mastododera; Thomson, 1857

Synonyms
- Mastodontodera Gemminger, 1872

= Mastododera =

Genus of beetles

Mastododera is a genus in the longhorn beetle family Cerambycidae. There are about 11 described species in Mastododera.

== Species ==
These 11 species belong to the genus Mastododera:

- Mastododera fallaciosa Villiers, 1982 (Madagascar)
- Mastododera jansoni Waterhouse, 1882 (Madagascar)
- Mastododera lateralis (Guérin-Méneville, 1844) (Madagascar)
- Mastododera monticola Villiers, 1982 (Madagascar)
- Mastododera nodicollis (Klug, 1833) (Madagascar)
- Mastododera rufosericans Fairmaire, 1893 (Comoros)
- Mastododera tibialis Fairmaire, 1894 (Madagascar)
- Mastododera transversalis Fairmaire, 1889 (Madagascar)
- Mastododera velutina Villiers, 1982 (Madagascar)
- Mastododera vicina Villiers, 1982 (Madagascar)
- Mastododera villiersi Vives, 2001 (Madagascar)
