= Mastododera jansoni =

Scientific classification
- Kingdom: Animalia
- Phylum: Arthropoda
- Class: Insecta
- Order: Coleoptera
- Suborder: Polyphaga
- Infraorder: Cucujiformia
- Family: Cerambycidae
- Genus: Mastododera
- Species: M. jansoni

Binomial name
- Mastododera jansoni Waterhouse, 1882

Synonyms
- Mastodontera jansoni (Waterhouse) Künckel, 1880

Species of beetle

Mastododera jansoni is the species of the Lepturinae subfamily in long-horned beetle family. This beetle is distributed on island of Madagascar.
