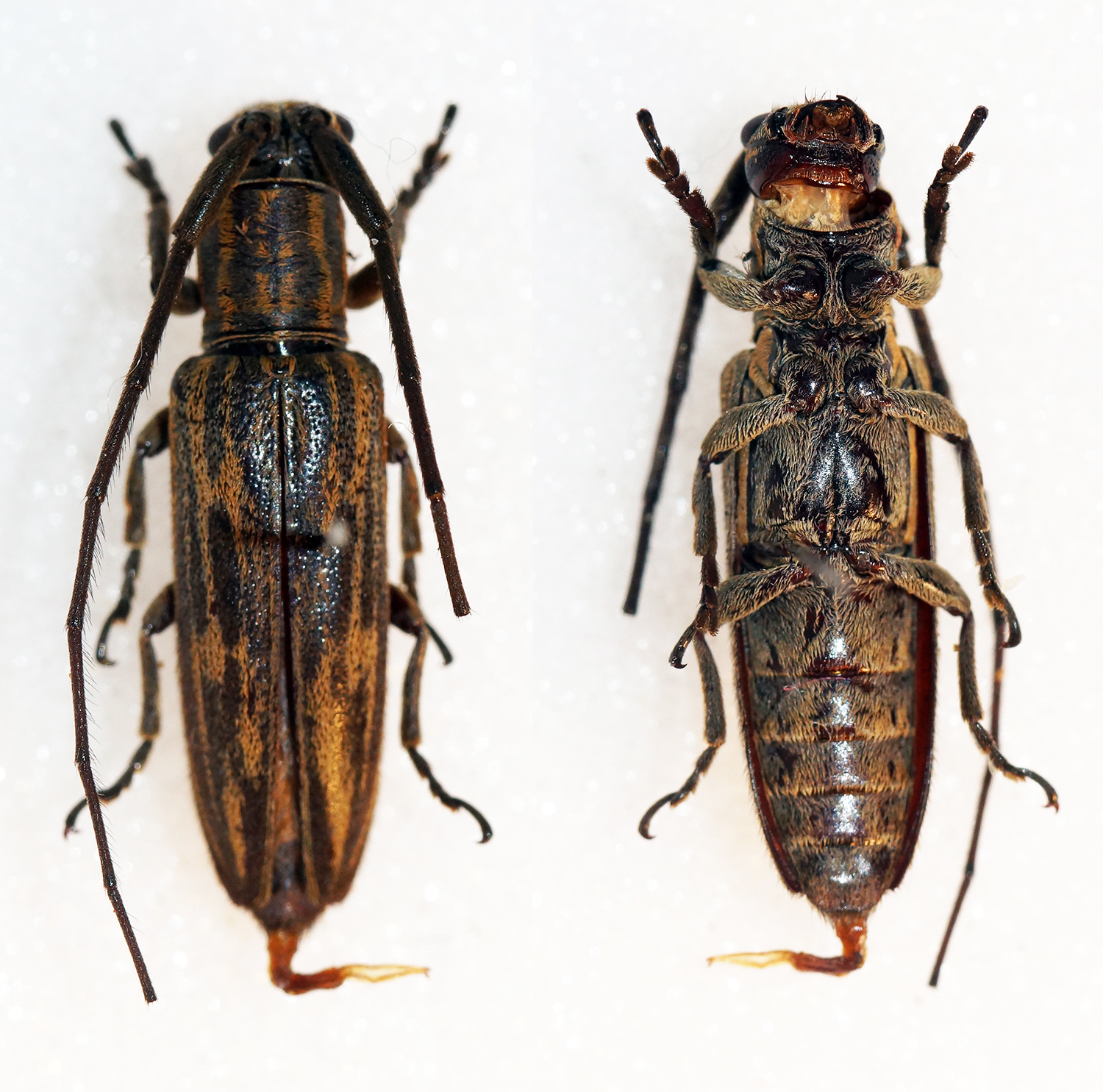

Scientific classification
- Domain: Eukaryota
- Kingdom: Animalia
- Phylum: Arthropoda
- Class: Insecta
- Order: Coleoptera
- Suborder: Polyphaga
- Infraorder: Cucujiformia
- Family: Cerambycidae
- Genus: Hippopsicon
- Species: H. lacteolum

Binomial name
- Hippopsicon lacteolum Thomson, 1858

= Hippopsicon lacteolum =

Species of beetle

Hippopsicon lacteolum is a species of beetle in the family Cerambycidae. It was described by Thomson in 1858.
