= Oedopeza cryptica =

Scientific classification
- Kingdom: Animalia
- Phylum: Arthropoda
- Class: Insecta
- Order: Coleoptera
- Suborder: Polyphaga
- Infraorder: Cucujiformia
- Family: Cerambycidae
- Genus: Oedopeza
- Species: O. cryptica

Binomial name
- Oedopeza cryptica Monné, 1990

Species of beetle

Oedopeza cryptica is a species of beetle in the family Cerambycidae. It was described by Monné in 1990.
