= Neseuterpia =

Scientific classification
- Domain: Eukaryota
- Kingdom: Animalia
- Phylum: Arthropoda
- Class: Insecta
- Order: Coleoptera
- Suborder: Polyphaga
- Infraorder: Cucujiformia
- Family: Cerambycidae
- Tribe: Acanthocinini
- Genus: Neseuterpia

Genus of beetles

Neseuterpia is a genus of beetles in the family Cerambycidae, containing the following species:

- Neseuterpia couturieri Tavakilian, 2001
- Neseuterpia curvipes Villiers, 1980
- Neseuterpia deknuydti Chalumeau & Touroult, 2005
