= Hyllisia niveovittata =

Scientific classification
- Kingdom: Animalia
- Phylum: Arthropoda
- Class: Insecta
- Order: Coleoptera
- Suborder: Polyphaga
- Infraorder: Cucujiformia
- Family: Cerambycidae
- Genus: Hyllisia
- Species: H. niveovittata

Binomial name
- Hyllisia niveovittata Aurivillius, 1910

Species of beetle

Hyllisia niveovittata is a species of beetle in the family Cerambycidae. It was described by Per Olof Christopher Aurivillius in 1910.
