= Hyllisia suturaloides =

Scientific classification
- Kingdom: Animalia
- Phylum: Arthropoda
- Class: Insecta
- Order: Coleoptera
- Suborder: Polyphaga
- Infraorder: Cucujiformia
- Family: Cerambycidae
- Genus: Hyllisia
- Species: H. suturaloides

Binomial name
- Hyllisia suturaloides Breuning, 1981

Species of beetle

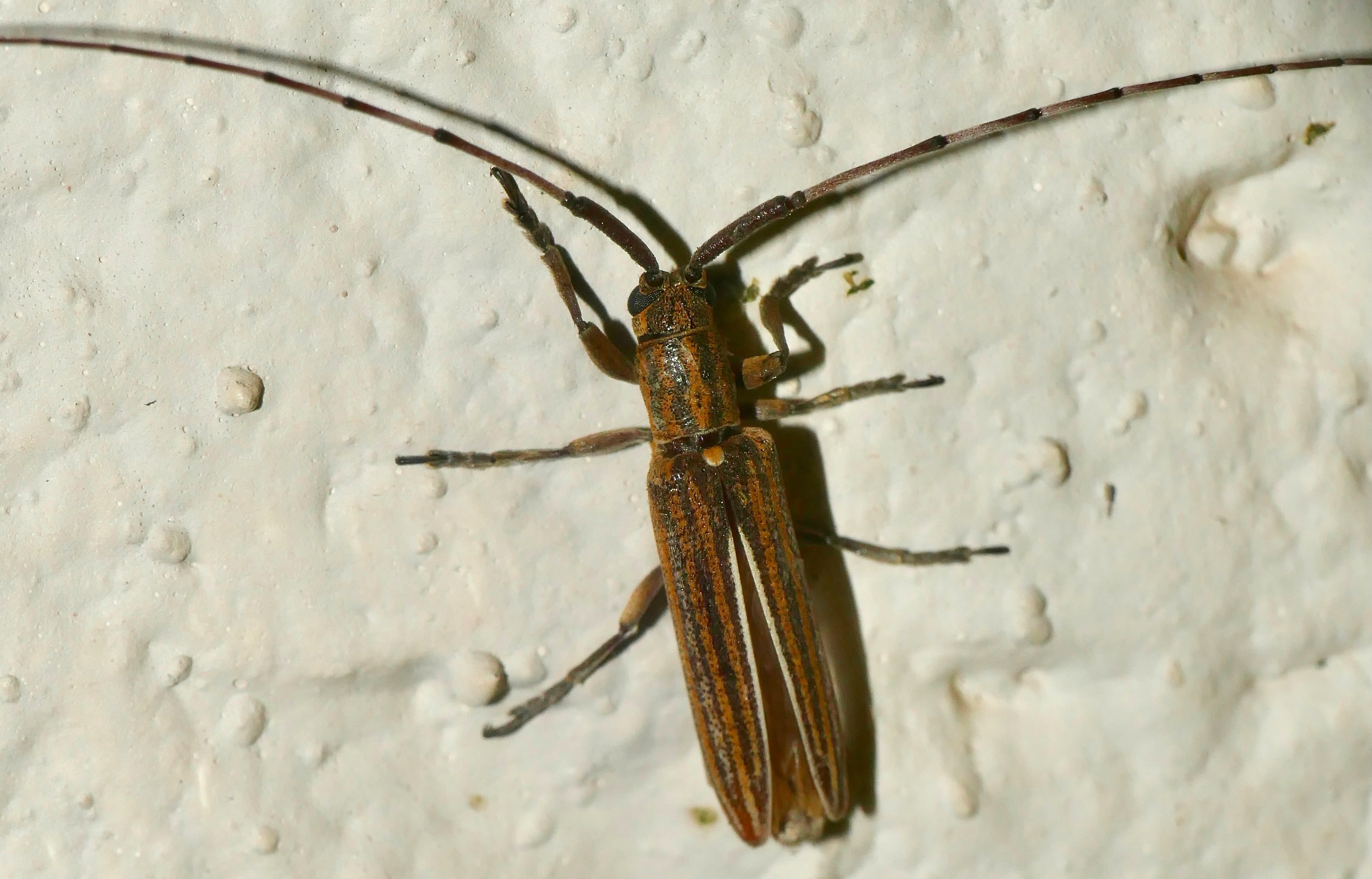
Longhorn Beetle (Hyllisia suturaloides)

Hyllisia suturaloides is a species of beetle in the family Cerambycidae. It was described by Breuning in 1981.
