= Hyllisia quadricollis =

Scientific classification
- Kingdom: Animalia
- Phylum: Arthropoda
- Class: Insecta
- Order: Coleoptera
- Suborder: Polyphaga
- Infraorder: Cucujiformia
- Family: Cerambycidae
- Genus: Hyllisia
- Species: H. quadricollis

Binomial name
- Hyllisia quadricollis Fairmaire, 1871

Species of beetle

Hyllisia quadricollis is a species of beetle in the family Cerambycidae. It was described by Fairmaire in 1871.
