= Hyllisia virgata =

Scientific classification
- Kingdom: Animalia
- Phylum: Arthropoda
- Class: Insecta
- Order: Coleoptera
- Suborder: Polyphaga
- Infraorder: Cucujiformia
- Family: Cerambycidae
- Genus: Hyllisia
- Species: H. virgata

Binomial name
- Hyllisia virgata Gerstaecker, 1871

Species of beetle

Hyllisia virgata is a species of beetle in the family Cerambycidae. It was described by Carl Eduard Adolph Gerstaecker in 1871.
