= Mimorsidis sarawakensis =

Scientific classification
- Kingdom: Animalia
- Phylum: Arthropoda
- Class: Insecta
- Order: Coleoptera
- Suborder: Polyphaga
- Infraorder: Cucujiformia
- Family: Cerambycidae
- Genus: Mimorsidis
- Species: M. sarawakensis

Binomial name
- Mimorsidis sarawakensis Hayashi, 1976

Species of beetle

Mimorsidis sarawakensis is a species of beetle in the family Cerambycidae. Masao Hayashi described it in 1976. It is known from Borneo and Malaysia.
