= Oedopeza umbrosa =

Scientific classification
- Kingdom: Animalia
- Phylum: Arthropoda
- Class: Insecta
- Order: Coleoptera
- Suborder: Polyphaga
- Infraorder: Cucujiformia
- Family: Cerambycidae
- Genus: Oedopeza
- Species: O. umbrosa

Binomial name
- Oedopeza umbrosa (Germar, 1824)

Species of beetle

Oedopeza umbrosa is a species of beetle in the family Cerambycidae. It was described by Ernst Friedrich Germar in 1824.
