= Hippopsicon macrophthalmum =

Scientific classification
- Kingdom: Animalia
- Phylum: Arthropoda
- Clade: Pancrustacea
- Class: Insecta
- Order: Coleoptera
- Suborder: Polyphaga
- Infraorder: Cucujiformia
- Family: Cerambycidae
- Genus: Hippopsicon
- Species: H. macrophthalmum

Binomial name
- Hippopsicon macrophthalmum Breuning, 1978

Species of beetle

Hippopsicon macrophthalmum is a species of beetle in the family Cerambycidae. It was described by entomologist Stephan von Breuning in 1978.
