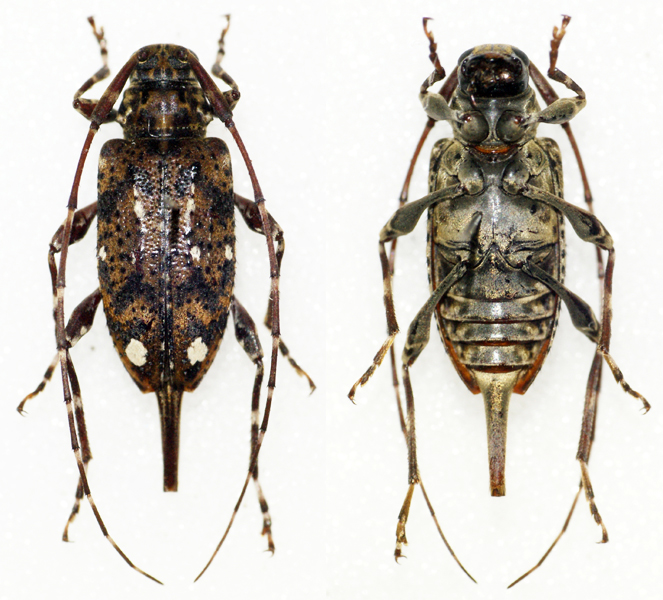

Scientific classification
- Kingdom: Animalia
- Phylum: Arthropoda
- Class: Insecta
- Order: Coleoptera
- Suborder: Polyphaga
- Infraorder: Cucujiformia
- Family: Cerambycidae
- Genus: Oedopeza
- Species: O. guttigera

Binomial name
- Oedopeza guttigera Bates, 1864

= Oedopeza guttigera =

Species of beetle

Oedopeza guttigera is a species of beetle in the family Cerambycidae. It was described by Bates in 1864.
