= Hyllisia albifrons =

Scientific classification
- Kingdom: Animalia
- Phylum: Arthropoda
- Class: Insecta
- Order: Coleoptera
- Suborder: Polyphaga
- Infraorder: Cucujiformia
- Family: Cerambycidae
- Genus: Hyllisia
- Species: H. albifrons

Binomial name
- Hyllisia albifrons Breuning, 1955

Species of beetle

Hyllisia albifrons is a species of beetle in the family Cerambycidae. It was described by Breuning in 1955.
