= Mimorsidis andamanicus =

Scientific classification
- Kingdom: Animalia
- Phylum: Arthropoda
- Class: Insecta
- Order: Coleoptera
- Suborder: Polyphaga
- Infraorder: Cucujiformia
- Family: Cerambycidae
- Genus: Mimorsidis
- Species: M. andamanicus

Binomial name
- Mimorsidis andamanicus Breuning, 1953

Species of beetle

Mimorsidis andamanicus is a species of beetle in the family Cerambycidae. It was described by Stephan von Breuning in 1953. It is known from Andaman Islands.
