= Hyllisia taihokensis =

Scientific classification
- Kingdom: Animalia
- Phylum: Arthropoda
- Class: Insecta
- Order: Coleoptera
- Suborder: Polyphaga
- Infraorder: Cucujiformia
- Family: Cerambycidae
- Genus: Hyllisia
- Species: H. taihokensis

Binomial name
- Hyllisia taihokensis (Matsushita, 1933)

Species of beetle

Hyllisia taihokensis is a species of beetle in the family Cerambycidae. It was described by Matsushita in 1933.
