= Hyllisia consimilis =

Scientific classification
- Kingdom: Animalia
- Phylum: Arthropoda
- Class: Insecta
- Order: Coleoptera
- Suborder: Polyphaga
- Infraorder: Cucujiformia
- Family: Cerambycidae
- Genus: Hyllisia
- Species: H. consimilis

Binomial name
- Hyllisia consimilis Gahan, 1895

Species of beetle

Hyllisia consimilis is a species of beetle in the family Cerambycidae. It was described by Gahan in 1895.
