= Hippopsicon densepunctatum =

Scientific classification
- Kingdom: Animalia
- Phylum: Arthropoda
- Class: Insecta
- Order: Coleoptera
- Suborder: Polyphaga
- Infraorder: Cucujiformia
- Family: Cerambycidae
- Genus: Hippopsicon
- Species: H. densepunctatum

Binomial name
- Hippopsicon densepunctatum Breuning, 1940

Species of beetle

Hippopsicon densepunctatum is a species of beetle in the family Cerambycidae. It was described by Breuning in 1940.
