= Neseuterpia couturieri =

Scientific classification
- Domain: Eukaryota
- Kingdom: Animalia
- Phylum: Arthropoda
- Class: Insecta
- Order: Coleoptera
- Suborder: Polyphaga
- Infraorder: Cucujiformia
- Family: Cerambycidae
- Genus: Neseuterpia
- Species: N. couturieri

Binomial name
- Neseuterpia couturieri Tavakilian, 2001

Species of beetle

Neseuterpia couturieri is a species of beetle in the family Cerambycidae. It was described by Tavakilian in 2001.
