= Mimorsidis =

Scientific classification
- Kingdom: Animalia
- Phylum: Arthropoda
- Class: Insecta
- Order: Coleoptera
- Suborder: Polyphaga
- Infraorder: Cucujiformia
- Family: Cerambycidae
- Tribe: Lamiini
- Genus: Mimorsidis

Genus of beetles

Mimorsidis is a genus of longhorn beetles of the subfamily Lamiinae, containing the following species:

- Mimorsidis andamanicus Breuning, 1953
- Mimorsidis lemoulti Breuning
- Mimorsidis mausoni Breuning, 1947
- Mimorsidis medanus Breuning, 1954
- Mimorsidis sarawakensis Hayashi, 1976
- Mimorsidis scutellatus Gressitt, 1951
- Mimorsidis yayeyamensis Samuelson, 1965
