= Paroecus celebensis =

Scientific classification
- Kingdom: Animalia
- Phylum: Arthropoda
- Class: Insecta
- Order: Coleoptera
- Suborder: Polyphaga
- Infraorder: Cucujiformia
- Family: Cerambycidae
- Genus: Paroecus
- Species: P. celebensis

Binomial name
- Paroecus celebensis (Thomson, 1857)

Species of beetle

Paroecus celebensis is a species of beetle in the family Cerambycidae. It was described by Thomson in 1857.
