= Oedopeza leucostigma =

Scientific classification
- Domain: Eukaryota
- Kingdom: Animalia
- Phylum: Arthropoda
- Class: Insecta
- Order: Coleoptera
- Suborder: Polyphaga
- Infraorder: Cucujiformia
- Family: Cerambycidae
- Genus: Oedopeza
- Species: O. leucostigma

Binomial name
- Oedopeza leucostigma Bates, 1864

Species of beetle

Oedopeza leucostigma is a species of beetle in the family Cerambycidae. It was described by Henry Walter Bates in 1864. It occurs in South (Brazil, Colombia, Ecuador, French Guiana, Peru) and Central America (Panama, Costa Rica).

Oedopeza leucostigma measure 8–18 mm (0.31–0.71 in). In French Guiana, it is one of the most abundant cerambycids associated with the Brazil nut family (Lecythidaceae). It is a "seasonal shifter" that preferentially utilizes ground branches during the dry season and canopy branches during the wet season as it larval habitat.
