= Fortuneleptura romei =

Scientific classification
- Kingdom: Animalia
- Phylum: Arthropoda
- Class: Insecta
- Order: Coleoptera
- Suborder: Polyphaga
- Infraorder: Cucujiformia
- Family: Cerambycidae
- Genus: Fortuneleptura
- Species: F. romei

Binomial name
- Fortuneleptura romei Touroult, 2011

Species of beetle

Fortuneleptura romei is a species of beetle in the family Cerambycidae. It was described by Touroult in 2011.
