= Hyllisia multigriseovittata =

Scientific classification
- Kingdom: Animalia
- Phylum: Arthropoda
- Class: Insecta
- Order: Coleoptera
- Suborder: Polyphaga
- Infraorder: Cucujiformia
- Family: Cerambycidae
- Genus: Hyllisia
- Species: H. multigriseovittata

Binomial name
- Hyllisia multigriseovittata Báguena & Breuning, 1958

Species of beetle

Hyllisia multigriseovittata is a species of beetle in the family Cerambycidae. It was described by Báguena and Breuning, in 1958.
