= Hyllisia tonkinea =

Scientific classification
- Kingdom: Animalia
- Phylum: Arthropoda
- Class: Insecta
- Order: Coleoptera
- Suborder: Polyphaga
- Infraorder: Cucujiformia
- Family: Cerambycidae
- Genus: Hyllisia
- Species: H. tonkinea

Binomial name
- Hyllisia tonkinea (Fairmaire, 1888)

Species of beetle

Hyllisia tonkinea is a species of beetle in the family Cerambycidae. It was described by Fairmaire in 1888.
