= Hyllisia lineata =

Scientific classification
- Kingdom: Animalia
- Phylum: Arthropoda
- Class: Insecta
- Order: Coleoptera
- Suborder: Polyphaga
- Infraorder: Cucujiformia
- Family: Cerambycidae
- Genus: Hyllisia
- Species: H. lineata

Binomial name
- Hyllisia lineata Gahan, 1894

Species of beetle

Hyllisia lineata is a species of beetle in the family Cerambycidae. It was described by Gahan in 1894.
