= Mimorsidis lemoulti =

Scientific classification
- Kingdom: Animalia
- Phylum: Arthropoda
- Class: Insecta
- Order: Coleoptera
- Suborder: Polyphaga
- Infraorder: Cucujiformia
- Family: Cerambycidae
- Genus: Mimorsidis
- Species: M. lemoulti

Binomial name
- Mimorsidis lemoulti Breuning, 1938

Synonyms
- Mimorsidis rondoni Breuning, 1965

Species of beetle

Mimorsidis lemoulti is a species of beetle in the family Cerambycidae. It was described by Stephan von Breuning in 1938. It is known from Laos.
