= Paroecus rigidus =

Scientific classification
- Kingdom: Animalia
- Phylum: Arthropoda
- Class: Insecta
- Order: Coleoptera
- Suborder: Polyphaga
- Infraorder: Cucujiformia
- Family: Cerambycidae
- Genus: Paroecus
- Species: P. rigidus

Binomial name
- Paroecus rigidus Bates, 1863

Species of beetle

Paroecus rigidus is a species of beetle in the family Cerambycidae. It was described by Henry Walter Bates in 1863.
