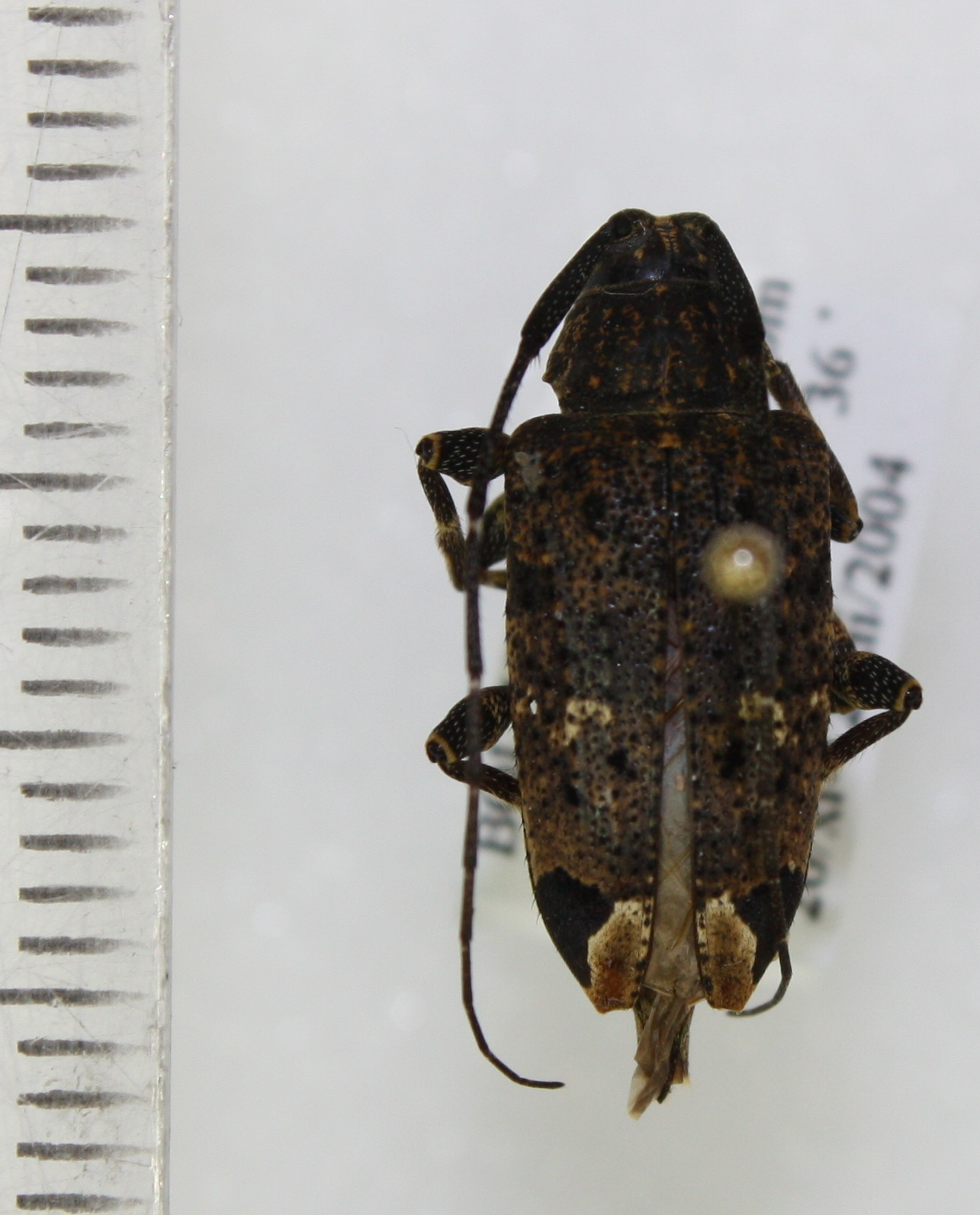
- Oedopeza costulata specimen from Bolivia

Scientific classification
- Kingdom: Animalia
- Phylum: Arthropoda
- Class: Insecta
- Order: Coleoptera
- Suborder: Polyphaga
- Infraorder: Cucujiformia
- Family: Cerambycidae
- Genus: Oedopeza
- Species: O. costulata

Binomial name
- Oedopeza costulata (Gilmour, 1962)

= Oedopeza costulata =

Species of beetle

Oedopeza costulata is a species of beetle in the family Cerambycidae. It was described by Gilmour in 1962.
