= Hyllisia ruficolor =

Scientific classification
- Kingdom: Animalia
- Phylum: Arthropoda
- Class: Insecta
- Order: Coleoptera
- Suborder: Polyphaga
- Infraorder: Cucujiformia
- Family: Cerambycidae
- Genus: Hyllisia
- Species: H. ruficolor

Binomial name
- Hyllisia ruficolor (Pic, 1934)

Species of beetle

Hyllisia ruficolor is a species of beetle in the family Cerambycidae. It was described by Maurice Pic in 1934.
