= Mastododera tibialis =

Scientific classification
- Kingdom: Animalia
- Phylum: Arthropoda
- Class: Insecta
- Order: Coleoptera
- Suborder: Polyphaga
- Infraorder: Cucujiformia
- Family: Cerambycidae
- Genus: Mastododera
- Species: M. tibialis

Binomial name
- Mastododera tibialis Fairmaire, 1894

Species of beetle

Mastododera tibialis is a species of beetle in the family Cerambycidae. It was described by Fairmaire in 1894.
