= Hippopsicon cribricolle =

Scientific classification
- Domain: Eukaryota
- Kingdom: Animalia
- Phylum: Arthropoda
- Class: Insecta
- Order: Coleoptera
- Suborder: Polyphaga
- Infraorder: Cucujiformia
- Family: Cerambycidae
- Genus: Hippopsicon
- Species: H. cribricolle

Binomial name
- Hippopsicon cribricolle Quedenfeldt, 1888

Species of beetle

Hippopsicon cribricolle is a species of beetle in the family Cerambycidae. It was described by Quedenfeldt in 1888.
