= Hyllisia delicatula =

Scientific classification
- Kingdom: Animalia
- Phylum: Arthropoda
- Class: Insecta
- Order: Coleoptera
- Suborder: Polyphaga
- Infraorder: Cucujiformia
- Family: Cerambycidae
- Genus: Hyllisia
- Species: H. delicatula

Binomial name
- Hyllisia delicatula Heller, 1924

Species of beetle

Hyllisia delicatula is a species of beetle in the family Cerambycidae. It was described by Karl Borromaeus Maria Josef Heller in 1924.
