= Oedopeza ocellator =

Scientific classification
- Kingdom: Animalia
- Phylum: Arthropoda
- Class: Insecta
- Order: Coleoptera
- Suborder: Polyphaga
- Infraorder: Cucujiformia
- Family: Cerambycidae
- Genus: Oedopeza
- Species: O. ocellator

Binomial name
- Oedopeza ocellator (Fabricius, 1801)

Species of beetle

Oedopeza ocellator is a species of beetle in the family Cerambycidae. It was described by Johan Christian Fabricius in 1801.
