= Oedopeza louisi =

Scientific classification
- Kingdom: Animalia
- Phylum: Arthropoda
- Class: Insecta
- Order: Coleoptera
- Suborder: Polyphaga
- Infraorder: Cucujiformia
- Family: Cerambycidae
- Genus: Oedopeza
- Species: O. louisi

Binomial name
- Oedopeza louisi Audureau, 2010

Species of beetle

Oedopeza louisi is a species of beetle in the family Cerambycidae. It was described by Audureau in 2010.
