= Hyllisia albocincta =

Scientific classification
- Kingdom: Animalia
- Phylum: Arthropoda
- Class: Insecta
- Order: Coleoptera
- Suborder: Polyphaga
- Infraorder: Cucujiformia
- Family: Cerambycidae
- Genus: Hyllisia
- Species: H. albocincta

Binomial name
- Hyllisia albocincta (Pic, 1924)

Species of beetle

Hyllisia albocincta is a species of beetle in the family Cerambycidae. It was described by Maurice Pic in 1924.
