= Mastododera villiersi =

Scientific classification
- Domain: Eukaryota
- Kingdom: Animalia
- Phylum: Arthropoda
- Class: Insecta
- Order: Coleoptera
- Suborder: Polyphaga
- Infraorder: Cucujiformia
- Family: Cerambycidae
- Genus: Mastododera
- Species: M. villiersi

Binomial name
- Mastododera villiersi Vives, 2001

Species of beetle

Mastododera villiersi is a species of beetle in the family Cerambycidae. It was described by Vives in 2001.
