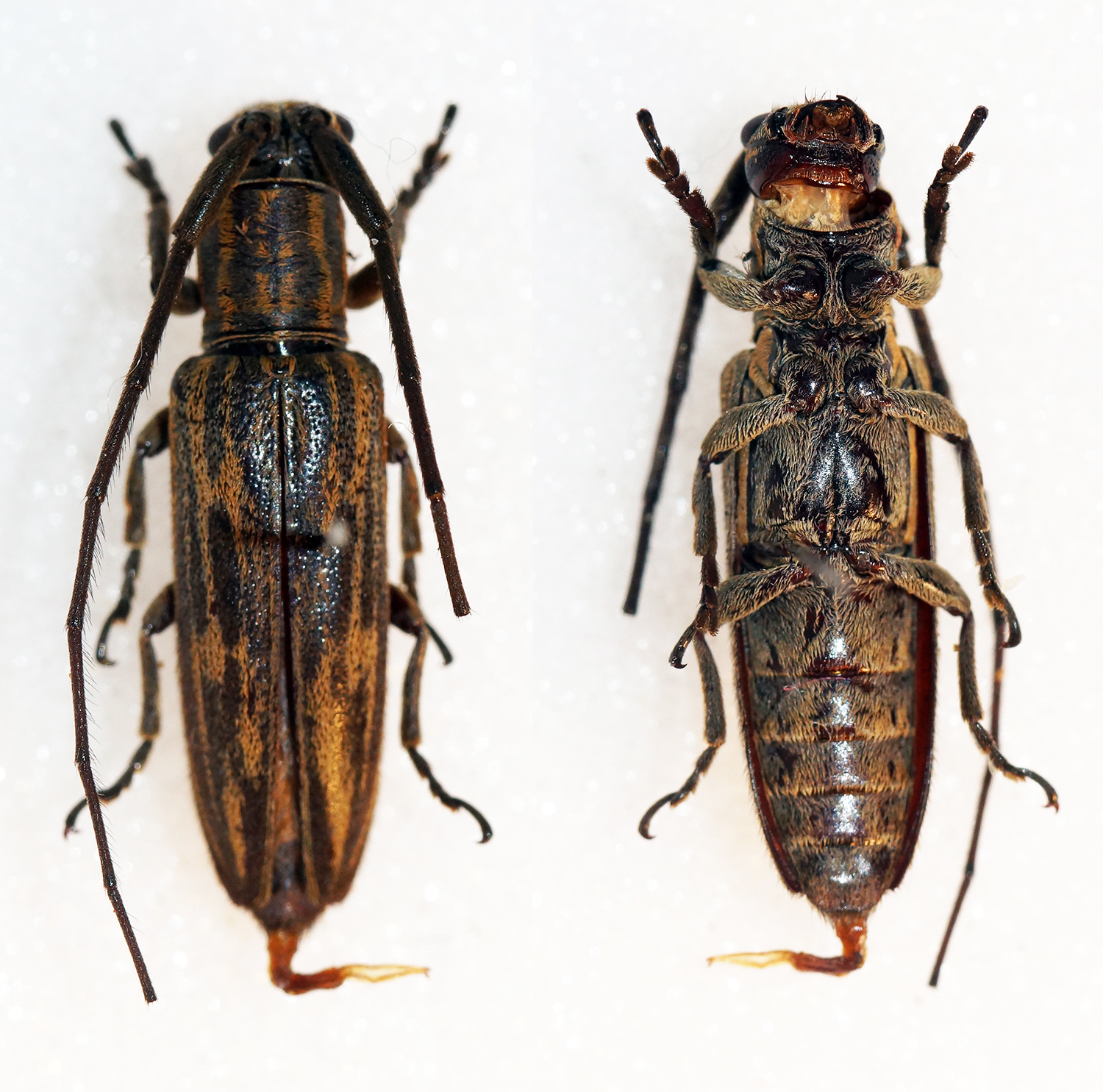
- Hippopsicon lacteolum

Scientific classification
- Domain: Eukaryota
- Kingdom: Animalia
- Phylum: Arthropoda
- Class: Insecta
- Order: Coleoptera
- Suborder: Polyphaga
- Infraorder: Cucujiformia
- Family: Cerambycidae
- Tribe: Agapanthiini
- Genus: Hippopsicon

= Hippopsicon =

Genus of beetles

Hippopsicon is a genus of beetles in the family Cerambycidae, containing the following species:

- Hippopsicon albopleurum Breuning, 1949
- Hippopsicon attenuatum Breuning, 1940
- Hippopsicon bambesae Breuning, 1952
- Hippopsicon clarkei Breuning, 1976
- Hippopsicon confluens Breuning, 1942
- Hippopsicon cordicolle Breuning, 1942
- Hippopsicon cribricolle Quedenfeldt, 1888
- Hippopsicon densepunctatum Breuning, 1940
- Hippopsicon densepuncticolle Breuning, 1981
- Hippopsicon griseopictum Breuning, 1940
- Hippopsicon griseovittatum Breuning, 1964
- Hippopsicon ivorense Breuning, 1968
- Hippopsicon lacteolum Thomson, 1858
- Hippopsicon luteolum Quedenfeldt, 1882
- Hippopsicon macrophthalmum Breuning, 1978
- Hippopsicon montanum Quentin & Villiers, 1981
- Hippopsicon ochreomaculatum Breuning, 1940
- Hippopsicon pleuricum Jordan, 1903
- Hippopsicon postochreomaculatum Breuning, 1968
- Hippopsicon puncticolle Aurivillius, 1907
- Hippopsicon rotundipenne Breuning, 1940
- Hippopsicon rugicolle Breuning, 1940
- Hippopsicon rusticum Gerstäcker, 1871
- Hippopsicon simile Breuning, 1956
- Hippopsicon victoriae Breuning, 1952
