= Mimorsidis scutellatus =

Scientific classification
- Kingdom: Animalia
- Phylum: Arthropoda
- Class: Insecta
- Order: Coleoptera
- Suborder: Polyphaga
- Infraorder: Cucujiformia
- Family: Cerambycidae
- Genus: Mimorsidis
- Species: M. scutellatus

Binomial name
- Mimorsidis scutellatus Gressitt, 1951

Synonyms
- Mimorsidis scutellata Gressitt, 1951 (misspelling)

Species of beetle

Mimorsidis scutellatus is a species of beetle in the family Cerambycidae. It was described by Gressitt in 1951. It is known from China.
