= Hyllisia damarensis =

Scientific classification
- Kingdom: Animalia
- Phylum: Arthropoda
- Class: Insecta
- Order: Coleoptera
- Suborder: Polyphaga
- Infraorder: Cucujiformia
- Family: Cerambycidae
- Genus: Hyllisia
- Species: H. damarensis

Binomial name
- Hyllisia damarensis Breuning, 1948

Species of beetle

Hyllisia damarensis is a species of beetle in the family Cerambycidae. It was described by Breuning in 1948.
