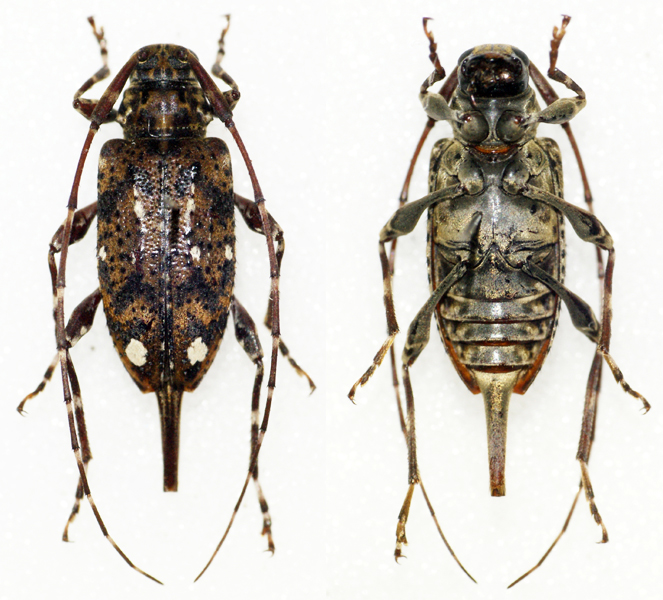
- Oedopeza guttigera

Scientific classification
- Kingdom: Animalia
- Phylum: Arthropoda
- Clade: Pancrustacea
- Class: Insecta
- Order: Coleoptera
- Suborder: Polyphaga
- Infraorder: Cucujiformia
- Family: Cerambycidae
- Tribe: Acanthocinini
- Genus: Oedopeza; Audinet-Serville, 1835

= Oedopeza =

Genus of beetles

Oedopeza is a genus of beetles in the family Cerambycidae. The genus is distributed in South America, Central America, and Mexico.

== Species ==
The following 15 species are recognized:

- Oedopeza apicale (Gilmour, 1962) (or Oedopeza apicalis)
- Oedopeza costulata (Gilmour, 1962)
- Oedopeza cryptica Monné, 1990
- Oedopeza flavosparsa Monné, 1990
- Oedopeza fleutiauxi (Villiers, 1980)
- Oedopeza guttigera Bates, 1864
- Oedopeza hovorei Heffern & Santos-Silva, 2024
- Oedopeza leucostigma Bates, 1864
- Oedopeza louisi Audureau, 2010
- Oedopeza maculatissima Monné & Martins, 1976
- Oedopeza ocellator (Fabricius, 1802) (or Oedopeza ocellata)
- Oedopeza raberi Heffern & Santos-Silva, 2024
- Oedopeza setigera (Bates, 1864)
- Oedopeza tavakiliani Monné M. A. & Monné M. L., 2012
- Oedopeza umbrosa (Germar, 1823)
