= Mastododera nodicollis =

Scientific classification
- Domain: Eukaryota
- Kingdom: Animalia
- Phylum: Arthropoda
- Class: Insecta
- Order: Coleoptera
- Suborder: Polyphaga
- Infraorder: Cucujiformia
- Family: Cerambycidae
- Genus: Mastododera
- Species: M. nodicollis

Binomial name
- Mastododera nodicollis (Klug, 1833)

Species of beetle

Mastododera nodicollis is a species of beetle in the family Cerambycidae. It was described by Johann Christoph Friedrich Klug in 1833.
