= Hyllisia imitans =

Scientific classification
- Kingdom: Animalia
- Phylum: Arthropoda
- Class: Insecta
- Order: Coleoptera
- Suborder: Polyphaga
- Infraorder: Cucujiformia
- Family: Cerambycidae
- Genus: Hyllisia
- Species: H. imitans

Binomial name
- Hyllisia imitans Duvivier, 1892

Species of beetle

Hyllisia imitans is a species of beetle in the family Cerambycidae. It was described by Duvivier in 1892.
