= Hyllisia stenideoides =

Scientific classification
- Kingdom: Animalia
- Phylum: Arthropoda
- Class: Insecta
- Order: Coleoptera
- Suborder: Polyphaga
- Infraorder: Cucujiformia
- Family: Cerambycidae
- Genus: Hyllisia
- Species: H. stenideoides

Binomial name
- Hyllisia stenideoides Pascoe, 1864

Species of beetle

Hyllisia stenideoides is a species of beetle in the family Cerambycidae. It was described by Pascoe in 1864.
