= Hyllisia indica =

Scientific classification
- Kingdom: Animalia
- Phylum: Arthropoda
- Class: Insecta
- Order: Coleoptera
- Suborder: Polyphaga
- Infraorder: Cucujiformia
- Family: Cerambycidae
- Genus: Hyllisia
- Species: H. indica

Binomial name
- Hyllisia indica Breuning, 1947

Species of beetle

Hyllisia indica is a species of beetle in the family Cerambycidae. It was described by Breuning in 1947.
