= Paroecus =

Scientific classification
- Kingdom: Animalia
- Phylum: Arthropoda
- Class: Insecta
- Order: Coleoptera
- Suborder: Polyphaga
- Infraorder: Cucujiformia
- Family: Cerambycidae
- Tribe: Acanthocinini
- Genus: Paroecus; Bates, 1863

Type species
- Paroecus rigidus Bates, 1863

Genus of beetles

Paroecus is a genus of beetles in the family Cerambycidae, containing the following species:

- Paroecus celebensis (Thomson, 1857)
- Paroecus charpentierae Villiers, 1971
- Paroecus rigidus Bates, 1863
