= Neseuterpia deknuydti =

Scientific classification
- Domain: Eukaryota
- Kingdom: Animalia
- Phylum: Arthropoda
- Class: Insecta
- Order: Coleoptera
- Suborder: Polyphaga
- Infraorder: Cucujiformia
- Family: Cerambycidae
- Genus: Neseuterpia
- Species: N. deknuydti

Binomial name
- Neseuterpia deknuydti Chalumeau & Touroult, 2005

Species of beetle

Neseuterpia deknuydti is a species of beetle in the family Cerambycidae. It was described by Chalumeau and Touroult in 2005.
