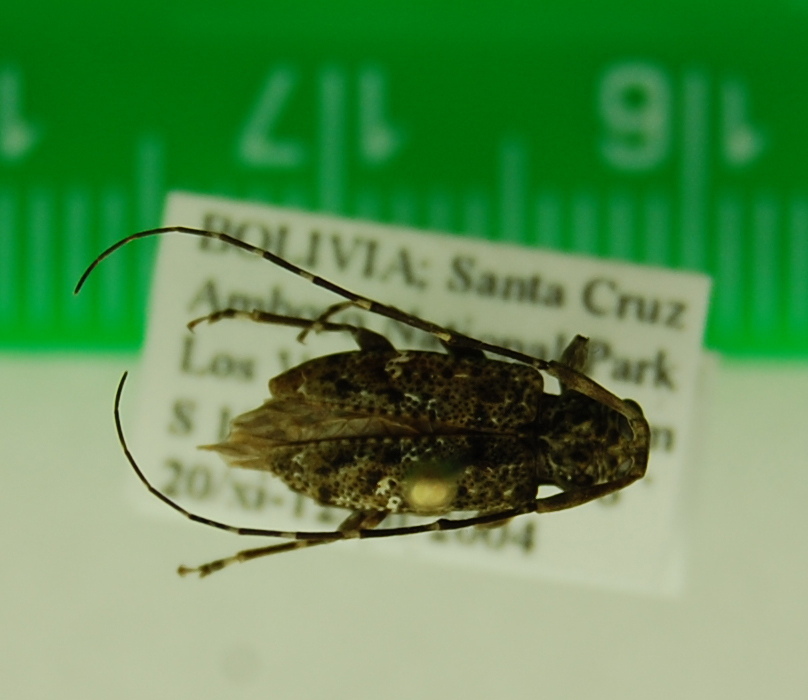

Scientific classification
- Kingdom: Animalia
- Phylum: Arthropoda
- Clade: Pancrustacea
- Class: Insecta
- Order: Coleoptera
- Suborder: Polyphaga
- Infraorder: Cucujiformia
- Family: Cerambycidae
- Genus: Oedopeza
- Species: O. maculatissima

Binomial name
- Oedopeza maculatissima Monné & Martins, 1976

= Oedopeza maculatissima =

Species of beetle

Oedopeza maculatissima is a species of beetle in the family Cerambycidae. It was described by Monné and Martins in 1976. It is found in Venezuela (Aragua), Peru (Junín), Brazil (Rondônia, Mato Grosso, Mato Grosso do Sul, Goiás, Espírito Santo, Paraná, Santa Catarina), Bolivia (Santa Cruz), Argentina (Salta) and Paraguay (Amambay).
