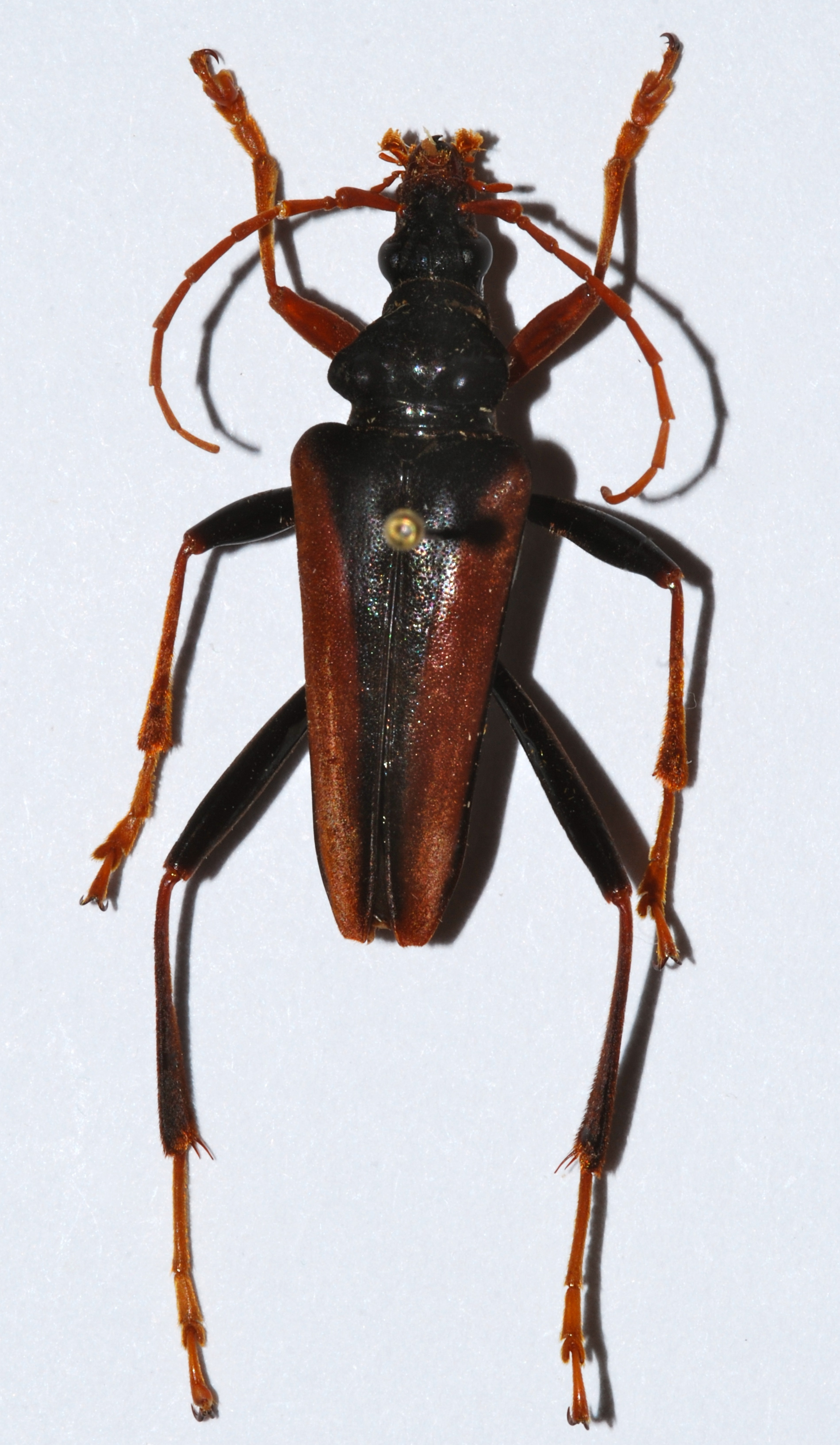

Scientific classification
- Domain: Eukaryota
- Kingdom: Animalia
- Phylum: Arthropoda
- Class: Insecta
- Order: Coleoptera
- Suborder: Polyphaga
- Infraorder: Cucujiformia
- Family: Cerambycidae
- Genus: Mastododera
- Species: M. lateralis

Binomial name
- Mastododera lateralis (Guérin-Méneville, 1844)

Synonyms
- Mastodontera lateralis (Guérin) Allaud, 1900; Mastodontera nodicollis var. lateralis (Guérin) Künckel, 1880; Toxotus lateralis Guérin, 1844

= Mastododera lateralis =

Species of beetle

Mastododera lateralis is the species of the Lepturinae subfamily in long-horned beetle family. This beetle is distributed on the island of Madagascar.
