= Boppeus fairmairei =

Scientific classification
- Domain: Eukaryota
- Kingdom: Animalia
- Phylum: Arthropoda
- Class: Insecta
- Order: Coleoptera
- Suborder: Polyphaga
- Infraorder: Cucujiformia
- Family: Cerambycidae
- Genus: Boppeus
- Species: B. fairmairei

Binomial name
- Boppeus fairmairei (Boppe, 1921)

Species of beetle

Boppeus fairmairei is a species of beetle in the family Cerambycidae. It was described by Boppe in 1921.
