= Hyllisia abyssinica =

Scientific classification
- Kingdom: Animalia
- Phylum: Arthropoda
- Class: Insecta
- Order: Coleoptera
- Suborder: Polyphaga
- Infraorder: Cucujiformia
- Family: Cerambycidae
- Genus: Hyllisia
- Species: H. abyssinica

Binomial name
- Hyllisia abyssinica Téocchi, Jiroux & Sudre, 2004

Species of beetle

Hyllisia abyssinica is a species of beetle in the family Cerambycidae. It was described by Téocchi, Jiroux and Sudre in 2004.
