= Bernard Gèze =

French geologist, hydrogeologist, volcanologist and speleologist

- Born: Bernard Marie Henri Gèze; March 24, 1913; Toulouse, France
- Died: December 8, 1996 (aged 83); Paris, France
- Occupation: Geologist

Bernard Gèze (March 24, 1913 – December 8, 1996) was a French geologist, hydrogeologist, volcanologist, and speleologist.

== Biography ==
Bernard Gèze was born on March 24, 1913, in Toulouse. In 1931, he enrolled in the National Agronomic Institute in Paris and graduated as an agronomist three years later. He worked as an assistant to Prof.Camille Arambourg and then, in 1936, to his successor, Prof. Pierre Lamare. During this time, he obtained a bachelor's degree in Natural Sciences from the Sorbonne University. In 1937, he earned his higher education diploma. At the beginning of the war, he served as a geological officer in the Army Corps of Nancy. As an assistant to Prof. Paul Fallot at the Collège de France in 1942, he prepared his thesis on the Montagne Noire, which he defended in 1949. He became a lecturer and then a professor of geology at the National School of Agriculture in Montpellier. He succeeded Prof. Lamare in 1954 at the Agronomy Institute, where he remained until his retirement in 1982.

In 1954, he became president of the French Geological Society. He was a corresponding member and then a full member of the French Academy of Agriculture.

Bernard Gèze died on December 8, 1996, in 5th arrondissement of Paris.

== Speleological Work ==
Bernard Gèze pioneered scientific speleology in France, focusing on karst and hydrogeology since the 1940s.

On 1930, he was one of the founders of the Spéléo-club de France, which became the Société spéléologique de France on 1936. In 1936, he was also one of the founding members of the Spéléo-club de Paris. In 1945, with Louis Fage, René Jeannel, Félix Trombe, Albert Vandel, among others, he founded a speleology commission within the CNRS, which he chaired from 1965 to 1976. During the same period, the Bureau de recherches géologiques et géophysiques entrusted Gèze with compiling a directory of natural cavities. He was also part of the hydrology section of the French National Committee for Geodesy and Geophysics. He became director of the underground laboratory of Moulis. With the support of these organizations and figures, Bernard Gèze founded the Annales de spéléologie in 1946, which constituted the third series of Spelunca, under the joint label of the SSF and the CAF.

In 1953, he was the secretary general of the first International Congress of Speleology in Paris, and then in 1963, he was one of the founders of the French Speleological Federation, and in 1965 in Postojna (Slovenia), of the International Union of Speleology, of which he was director until 1973 when he became honorary president.

He participated in famous underground explorations: Henne Morte (1946), Rognès shaft (1948), Penne Blanque chasm (1955), Padirac chasm (1952), among others. A room in the Orgnac Cave is named after him.

== Honors ==
- Knight of the Legion of Honour
- Knight of the Order of Academic Palms
- Officer of the Order of Agricultural Merit
- Officer of the Order of Sports Merit
- Honorary member of the French Federation of Speleology
- Honorary president of the International Union of Speleology
- Grand Medal of the Club Cévenol

== Publications ==
- 1937 – "Étude hydrogéologique et morphologique de la bordure sud-ouest du Massif central," Ann. Inst. nat. agronomique tome XXIX, Paris, 80 p.
- 1939 – "Influence de la tectonique sur la localisation des sources vauclusiennes," Actes du Congrès national de spéléologie de Mazamet
- 1943 – "Géographie physique et géologie du Cameroun occidental," Mém. Mus. nat. Hist. nat. tome 17, 172 p.
- 1947 – "Paléosols et sols dus à l'évolution actuelle," Ann. Ecole nat. Agriculture Montpellier tome XXVII fascicule IV, Montpellier, 25 p.
- 1948 – "La capture souterraine du Thoré (versant atlantique) par le Jaur (versant méditerranéen)," Ann. Spéléologie tome III fascicule 4, p. 233-242
- 1949 – "Méthode d'étude de la zonalité pédogénétique par la paléopédologie," C. R. Acad. Sci., Paris, tome 228, p. 333-334
- 1949 – "Étude géologique de la Montagne Noire et des Cévennes méridionales," Mém. Soc. géol. France, No. 62, 215 p.
- 1952 – "Sur le sens de déversement des nappes de la Montagne Noire," Bull. Soc. géol. France, (6) tome II, p. 491-534
- 1953 – "Allocution présidentielle: La genèse des gouffres," Premier congrès international de spéléologie, tome II - Communications; Section I - Hydrogéologie et Morphologie karstique, Paris, p. 11-24
- 1953 – "Les volcans du Cameroun occidental," Bull. Volcanol. (II) tome XIII, Naples, p. 63-92
- 1955 – "Le volcanisme des Causses et du Bas-Languedoc (France)," Bull. Volcanol. (II) tome XVII, Naples, p. 73-89
- 1959 – "Les volcans du Tibesti (Sahara du Tchad)," Bull. Volcanol. (II) tome XXII, Naples, p. 135-172
- 1960–63 – "Caractères structuraux de l'arc de Nice (Alpes maritimes)," Livre mém. Paul Fallot, Mémoire hors série tome II, Société géologique de France, Paris, p. 289-300
- 1965 – La Spéléologie scientifique, Éditions du Seuil, Paris
- 1974 – La « geste » de Robert de Joly, explorateur d'abîmes, Chez Pierre Fanlac, Périgueux
- 1976 – "Aquitaine orientale," Guides géologiques régionaux, Éd. Masson, Paris
- 1979 – "Languedoc méditerranéen," Guides géologiques régionaux, Éd. Masson, Paris
- 1985 – "Origines et évolution de la géospéléologie française", Travaux du Comité français d'histoire de la géologie, tome III, Paris
- 1986 – "La géologie dans les romans de Jules Verne", Travaux du comité français d'histoire de la géologie, tome IV, No. 9, Paris, p. 71-79
- 1991 – "Présidents à gratter", Travaux du comité français d'histoire de la géologie, tome V, No. 11, Paris, p. 99-115
- 1994 – "Analyse d'ouvrage :"Cent ans de spéléologie française"", Spelunca–Mémoire, No. 17, Lyon & Travaux du comité français d'histoire de la géologie, tome VIII, No. 10, Paris, p. 117
- 1994 – "La ruée vers le phosphate dans les cavernes du Midi de la France", Travaux du comité français d'histoire de la géologie, tome VIII, No. 5, Paris, p. 41-54
- 1997 – "La ruée vers le phosphate dans les cavernes du Midi de la France," De la géologie à son histoire, Comité des travaux historiques et scientifiques, Paris, section des Sciences, vol. 13, p. 207-216 (posthumously)

== Bibliography ==
- Chabert, C. (1997) - « Obituaire : Bernard GEZE (1913–1996) », ANAR Bull' No. 2, Association nationale des anciens responsables de la FFS, Lyon, p. 1
- Durand-Delga, M. (1997) - « À travers Bernard Gèze (1913-1996) : aspects de la géologie parisienne au milieu du siècle », Travaux du Comité français d'histoire de la géologie, tome XI, Paris
- "Bernard GÈZE (24 mars 2013, Toulouse / 8 décembre 1996)". le site du CLPA. 2014-03-24.
- "Bernard Gèze, géologue, hydrogéologue (Toulouse 1913 – Paris 1996)". le site des Amis des sciences de la nature. 2014-01-12.
