= André Villiers (entomologist) =

French entomologist and herpetologist

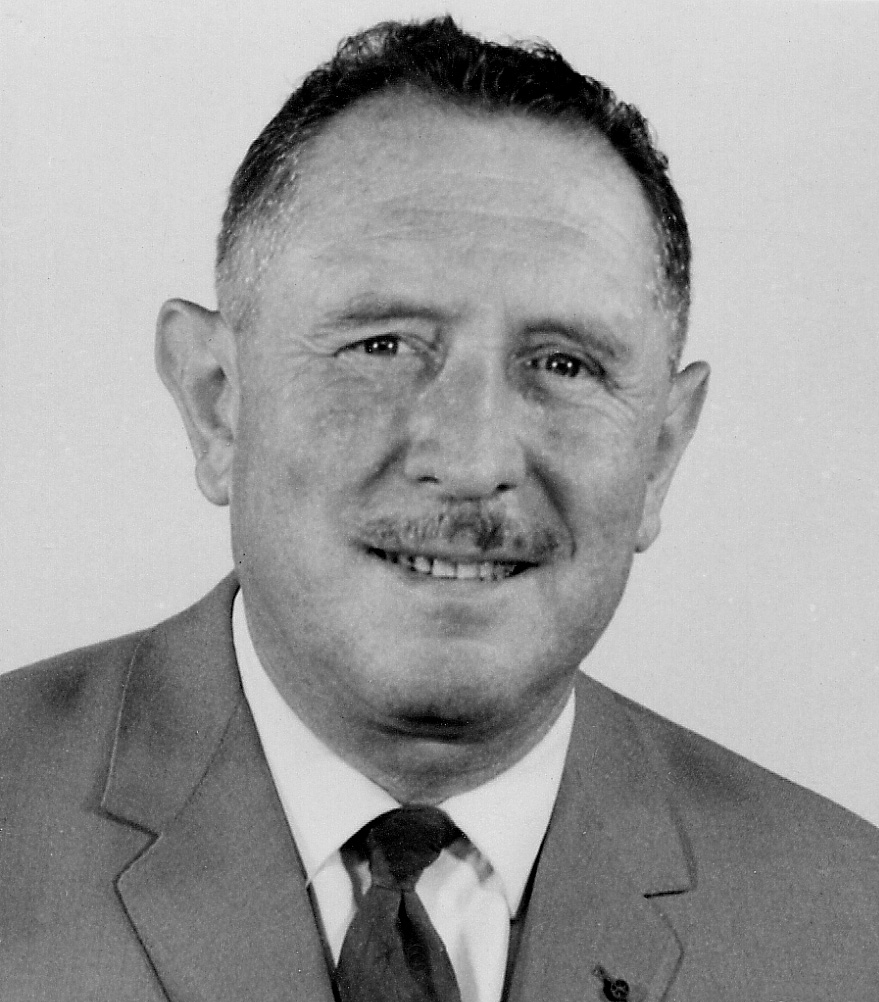
- Portrait of André Villiers
- Born: André Clément Villiers; 9 April 1915; Le Perreux-sur-Marne, France
- Died: 8 June 1983 (aged 68); Le Perreux-sur-Marne, France
- Education: Doctor of Science (1943)
- Known for: Research on Coleoptera (especially Cerambycidae and Languriidae), Hemiptera, reptiles, amphibians and birds
- Awards: Constant Prize of the Société entomologique de France (1949); President of the Société entomologique de France (1968); Thérèse and Maurice Pic Prize of the Société entomologique de France (1983)
- Scientific career
- Fields: Entomology, herpetology

André Clément Villiers (9 April 1915 – 8 June 1983) was a French entomologist and herpetologist. He conducted research on beetles, particularly longhorn beetles and Languriidae, as well as Hemiptera, reptiles, amphibians and birds.

== Biography ==
André Villiers developed an interest in natural history at an early age. At the age of thirteen, he began frequenting the entomology laboratory of the Muséum national d'histoire naturelle in Paris, where he came into contact with the entomologist René Gabriel Jeannel (1879–1965). He also participated in the activities of the Coléoptéristes de la Seine, a group of beetle specialists active in the Paris region.

After completing his military service, Villiers joined the Muséum national d'histoire naturelle in 1937 as a technical assistant. He participated in several scientific expeditions, including an expedition to Cameroon led by Bernard Gèze (1913–1996). In 1943, he received his Doctor of Science degree with a dissertation entitled Études morphologique et biologique des Languriitae (Col. Erotylidae) ("Morphological and biological studies of the Languriitae"). After the end of the Second World War, Théodore Monod (1902–2000) invited him to take charge of entomological work at the French Institute of Black Africa (IFAN).

Villiers returned to metropolitan France in 1956. At the request of Eugène Séguy (1890–1985), he succeeded him as deputy director of the entomology laboratory. In 1968, he was elected president of the Société entomologique de France. He retired in 1980 after having been appointed professor at the Muséum national d'histoire naturelle.

Villiers was the author of 761 publications. His work dealt principally with Coleoptera, including cerambycid beetles and Languriidae, and with Hemiptera, including Reduviidae and Enicocephalidae. He also published research on reptiles, amphibians and birds. In addition, he was interested in the role of animals in the culture of the Bakweri people of Cameroon.

Together with Renaud Paulian (1913–2003) and Guy Colas (1902–1993), Villiers helped establish the journal L'Entomologiste. During his career, he collected approximately one million specimens and substantially enriched the collections of the Muséum national d'histoire naturelle.

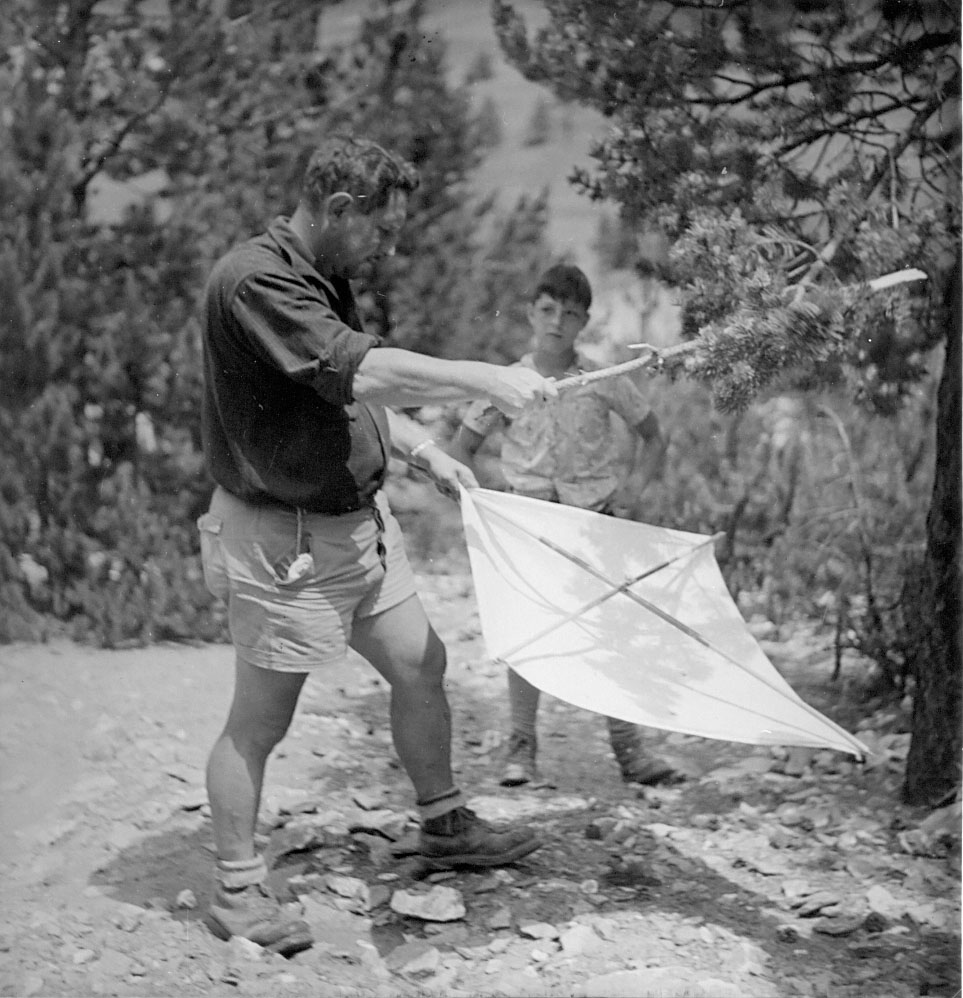
André Villiers using a beating technique to collect insects

== Selected publications ==
- Villiers, André; Descarpentries, André. Petits animaux des eaux douces. Paris: Nathan. p. 122.
- Villiers, André (1943). Étude morphologique et biologique des Languriitae. Publications du Muséum national d'histoire naturelle. p. 98.
- Villiers, André (1945–1947). Atlas des hémiptères de France. Vol. 2 volumes. Paris: Boubée.
- Villiers, André (1946). Coléoptères cérambycides de l'Afrique du Nord. Paris: Office de la recherche scientifique coloniale. p. 153.
- Villiers, André; Dekeyser, Pierre-Louis (1948). Récolte et préparation des collections zoologiques. Dakar: IFAN. p. 44.
- Villiers, André (1948). Hémiptères réduviidés de l'Afrique noire. Paris: Office de la recherche scientifique coloniale. p. 489.
- Villiers, André; Dekeyser, Pierre-Louis (1949). Mission P. L. Dekeyser et A. Villiers en Guinée et Côte d'Ivoire. 1946, Insectes. Dakar: G.I.A. p. 90.
- Villiers, André (1949). "Révision des Émésides africains (Hémiptères réduviidés)". Mémoires du Muséum d'histoire naturelle, new series, 23 (2): 257–392.
- Villiers, André (1950). Les Serpents de l'Ouest africain. Dakar: IFAN. p. 148.
- Villiers, André; Dekeyser, Pierre-Louis (1951). Les Animaux protégés de l'Afrique noire. Dakar: IFAN. p. 128.
- Villiers, André (1951). La Collection de serpents de l'I. F. A. N. Dakar: IFAN. p. 155.
- Villiers, André (1952). Hémiptères de l'Afrique noire punaises et cigales. Dakar: IFAN. p. 256.
- Villiers, André (1956). Contribution à l'étude du peuplement de la Mauritanie. Notations écologiques et biogéographiques sur la faune de l'Adrar. Dakar: IFAN. p. 222.
- Villiers, André (1957). Les Lépidoptères de l'Afrique noire française. Vol. 2 fascicles. Dakar: IFAN.
- Villiers, André (1958). Faune de Madagascar. 7, Insectes hémiptères Enicocephalidae. Institut de recherche scientifique de Madagascar. p. 79.
- Villiers, André (1958). Les Plus beaux insectes. Paris: Larousse. p. 96.
- Villiers, André (1958). Tortues et crocodiles de l'Afrique noire française. Dakar: IFAN. p. 355.
- Villiers, André (1964). Les Insectes. Paris: Hachette. p. 64.
- Villiers, André (1968). Faune de Madagascar. 28, Insectes hémiptères Reduviidae. I. Paris: ORSTOM and CNRS. p. 199.
- Villiers, André; Quentin, René Michel (1975). Faune de Madagascar. 40, Insectes, Coléoptères, Cerambycidae. Paris: ORSTOM and CNRS. p. 251.
- Villiers, André (1977). L'Entomologiste amateur. Paris: Lechevalier. p. 248. ISBN 2-7205-0496-3.
- Villiers, André (1978). Faune des Coléoptères de France, vol. I: Cerambycidae. Encyclopédie entomologique. Paris: Lechevalier. p. 611. ISBN 2-7205-0498-X. ISSN 0301-4282.
- Villiers, André (1979). Faune de Madagascar. 49. 2, Insectes Hémiptères Reduviidae. Paris: ORSTOM and CNRS. p. 202.
- Villiers, André (1979). Initiation à l'entomologie. Paris: Boubée. p. 324. ISBN 2-85004-014-2.
- Villiers, André (1980). Faune de Madagascar. 52, Insectes Coléoptères Cerambycidae Disteniinae. Paris: ORSTOM and CNRS. p. 133.
