= Bordoni =

Bordoni is an Italian surname. Notable people with the surname include:

- Antonio Maria Bordoni (1789–1860), Italian mathematician
- Ernesta Bordoni (1873–?), Italian alleged prostitute and convicted murderer studied by criminologists
- Faustina Bordoni (1697–1781), Italian mezzo-soprano
- Francesco Bordoni (1580–1654), Italian sculptor
- Franco Bordoni (1913–1975), Italian World War II flying ace and racing car driver
- Frank Bordoni (born 1965/66), British celebrity chef
- Giovanni Bordoni, alias of Catterina Vizzani (1719–1743), Italian woman who lived as a man
- Irène Bordoni (1885–1953), French-American singer, Broadway and film actress
- Isabella Bordoni (born 1962), Italian poet, writer and artist
- Paolo Bordoni (born 1963), Italian football goalkeeper
- Piero Giorgio Bordoni (1915–2009), Italian physicist
- Simona Bordoni (born 1972), American climate scientist

== See also ==
- Multiple species of insects:
  - Blennidus bordoni, a species of beetle
  - Callia bordoni, a species of beetle
  - Cothurus bordoni, a species of beetle
  - Cyrtinus bordoni, a species of beetle
  - Gnomidolon bordoni, a species of beetle
  - Lepturgotrichona bordoni, a species of beetle
  - Macrocheles bordoni, a species of mite
  - Piezophidion bordoni, a species of beetle
  - Trichillurges bordoni, a species of beetle
- Fondazione Ugo Bordoni, an Italian research foundation
- Villa Bordoni, a villa in Tuscany, Italy
- Bordone (disambiguation)
