= Oby =

Oby or OBY can refer to:

- Oby (village), a medieval village located in Ashby with Oby, England, UK
- Obiageli, a Nigerian feminine given name
- Ittoqqortoormiit Heliport, an heliport in Ittoqqortoormiit, Greenland, by IATA code
- Olav Øby (born 1994), a Norwegian footballer
- Callia oby, a species of beetle found in Brazil
