= Cyrtinus opacicollis =

Scientific classification
- Kingdom: Animalia
- Phylum: Arthropoda
- Clade: Pancrustacea
- Class: Insecta
- Order: Coleoptera
- Suborder: Polyphaga
- Infraorder: Cucujiformia
- Family: Cerambycidae
- Genus: Cyrtinus
- Species: C. opacicollis

Binomial name
- Cyrtinus opacicollis (Bates, 1885)

Species of beetle

Cyrtinus opacicollis is a species of beetle in the family Cerambycidae. It was described by Bates in 1885. It is known from Guatemala.
