= Cyrtinus acunai =

Scientific classification
- Kingdom: Animalia
- Phylum: Arthropoda
- Clade: Pancrustacea
- Class: Insecta
- Order: Coleoptera
- Suborder: Polyphaga
- Infraorder: Cucujiformia
- Family: Cerambycidae
- Genus: Cyrtinus
- Species: C. acunai

Binomial name
- Cyrtinus acunai Fisher, 1935

Species of beetle

Cyrtinus acunai is a species of beetle in the family Cerambycidae. It was described by Fisher in 1935. It is known from Cuba.
