= Trichillurges simplex =

Scientific classification
- Kingdom: Animalia
- Phylum: Arthropoda
- Class: Insecta
- Order: Coleoptera
- Suborder: Polyphaga
- Infraorder: Cucujiformia
- Family: Cerambycidae
- Genus: Trichillurges
- Species: T. simplex

Binomial name
- Trichillurges simplex Martins & Monné, 1974

Species of beetle

Trichillurges simplex is a species of beetle in the family Cerambycidae. It was described by Martins and Monné in 1974.
