= Cyrtinus eugeniae =

Scientific classification
- Kingdom: Animalia
- Phylum: Arthropoda
- Clade: Pancrustacea
- Class: Insecta
- Order: Coleoptera
- Suborder: Polyphaga
- Infraorder: Cucujiformia
- Family: Cerambycidae
- Genus: Cyrtinus
- Species: C. eugeniae

Binomial name
- Cyrtinus eugeniae Fisher, 1935

Species of beetle

Cyrtinus eugeniae is a species of beetle in the family Cerambycidae. It was described by Fisher in 1935. It is known from Puerto Rico.
