= Callia cyanea =

Scientific classification
- Kingdom: Animalia
- Phylum: Arthropoda
- Class: Insecta
- Order: Coleoptera
- Suborder: Polyphaga
- Infraorder: Cucujiformia
- Family: Cerambycidae
- Genus: Callia
- Species: C. cyanea

Binomial name
- Callia cyanea Melzer, 1931

Species of beetle

Callia cyanea is a species of beetle in the family Cerambycidae. It was described by Melzer in 1931. It is known from Brazil.
