= Lepturgotrichona =

Scientific classification
- Kingdom: Animalia
- Phylum: Arthropoda
- Class: Insecta
- Order: Coleoptera
- Suborder: Polyphaga
- Infraorder: Cucujiformia
- Family: Cerambycidae
- Tribe: Acanthocinini
- Genus: Lepturgotrichona

Genus of beetles

Lepturgotrichona is a genus of beetles in the family Cerambycidae, containing the following species:

- Lepturgotrichona bordoni Monné & Martins, 1976
- Lepturgotrichona cubaecola (Fisher, 1942)
- Lepturgotrichona stigmatica (Bates, 1881)
