= Callia ambigua =

Scientific classification
- Kingdom: Animalia
- Phylum: Arthropoda
- Class: Insecta
- Order: Coleoptera
- Suborder: Polyphaga
- Infraorder: Cucujiformia
- Family: Cerambycidae
- Genus: Callia
- Species: C. ambigua

Binomial name
- Callia ambigua Bates, 1885

Species of beetle

Callia ambigua is a species of longhorn beetle in the tribe Calliini in the genus Callia, discovered by Bates in 1885.
