= Cyrtinus jamaicensis =

Scientific classification
- Kingdom: Animalia
- Phylum: Arthropoda
- Clade: Pancrustacea
- Class: Insecta
- Order: Coleoptera
- Suborder: Polyphaga
- Infraorder: Cucujiformia
- Family: Cerambycidae
- Genus: Cyrtinus
- Species: C. jamaicensis

Binomial name
- Cyrtinus jamaicensis Howden, 1970

Species of beetle

Cyrtinus jamaicensis is a species of beetle in the family Cerambycidae. It was described by Howden in 1970. It is known from Jamaica, from which its species epithet is derived.
