= Cyrtinus humilis =

Scientific classification
- Kingdom: Animalia
- Phylum: Arthropoda
- Clade: Pancrustacea
- Class: Insecta
- Order: Coleoptera
- Suborder: Polyphaga
- Infraorder: Cucujiformia
- Family: Cerambycidae
- Genus: Cyrtinus
- Species: C. humilis

Binomial name
- Cyrtinus humilis Zayas, 1975

Species of beetle

Cyrtinus humilis is a species of beetle in the family Cerambycidae. It was described by Zayas in 1975. It is known from Cuba.
