= Callia marginata =

Scientific classification
- Kingdom: Animalia
- Phylum: Arthropoda
- Class: Insecta
- Order: Coleoptera
- Suborder: Polyphaga
- Infraorder: Cucujiformia
- Family: Cerambycidae
- Genus: Callia
- Species: C. marginata

Binomial name
- Callia marginata Galileo & Martins, 2002

Species of beetle

Callia marginata is a species of beetle in the family Cerambycidae. It was described by Galileo and Martins in 2002. It is known from Peru.
