= Callia pulchra =

Scientific classification
- Kingdom: Animalia
- Phylum: Arthropoda
- Class: Insecta
- Order: Coleoptera
- Suborder: Polyphaga
- Infraorder: Cucujiformia
- Family: Cerambycidae
- Genus: Callia
- Species: C. pulchra

Binomial name
- Callia pulchra Melzer, 1930

Species of beetle

Callia pulchra is a species of beetle in the family Cerambycidae. It was described by Melzer in 1930. It is known from Brazil, Bolivia, Argentina and Paraguay.
