= Callia azurea =

Scientific classification
- Kingdom: Animalia
- Phylum: Arthropoda
- Class: Insecta
- Order: Coleoptera
- Suborder: Polyphaga
- Infraorder: Cucujiformia
- Family: Cerambycidae
- Genus: Callia
- Species: C. azurea

Binomial name
- Callia azurea Audinet-Serville, 1835

Species of beetle

Callia azurea is a species of beetle in the family Cerambycidae. It was described by Audinet-Serville in 1835. It is known from Brazil.
