= Gnomidolon sinopium =

Scientific classification
- Kingdom: Animalia
- Phylum: Arthropoda
- Class: Insecta
- Order: Coleoptera
- Suborder: Polyphaga
- Infraorder: Cucujiformia
- Family: Cerambycidae
- Genus: Gnomidolon
- Species: G. sinopium

Binomial name
- Gnomidolon sinopium Martins, 2006

Species of beetle

Gnomidolon sinopium is a species of beetle in the family Cerambycidae. It was described by Martins in 2006.
