= Cyrtinus beckeri =

Scientific classification
- Kingdom: Animalia
- Phylum: Arthropoda
- Clade: Pancrustacea
- Class: Insecta
- Order: Coleoptera
- Suborder: Polyphaga
- Infraorder: Cucujiformia
- Family: Cerambycidae
- Genus: Cyrtinus
- Species: C. beckeri

Binomial name
- Cyrtinus beckeri Howden, 1960

Species of beetle

Cyrtinus beckeri is a species of beetle in the family Cerambycidae. It was described by Howden in 1960 and is found in the United States. It feeds on the Bigtooth maple.
