= Gnomidolon insulicola =

Scientific classification
- Kingdom: Animalia
- Phylum: Arthropoda
- Class: Insecta
- Order: Coleoptera
- Suborder: Polyphaga
- Infraorder: Cucujiformia
- Family: Cerambycidae
- Genus: Gnomidolon
- Species: G. insulicola

Binomial name
- Gnomidolon insulicola Bates, 1885

Species of beetle

Gnomidolon insulicola is a species of beetle in the family Cerambycidae. It was described by Bates in 1885.
