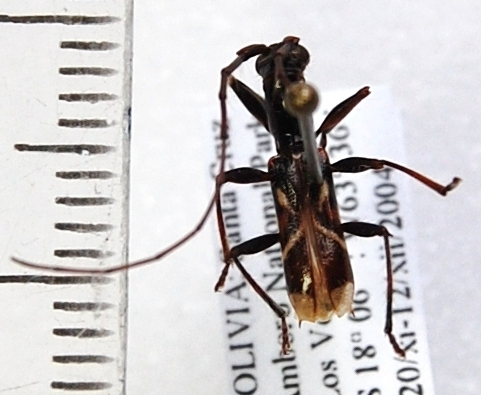
- Gnomidolon musivum

Scientific classification
- Domain: Eukaryota
- Kingdom: Animalia
- Phylum: Arthropoda
- Class: Insecta
- Order: Coleoptera
- Suborder: Polyphaga
- Infraorder: Cucujiformia
- Family: Cerambycidae
- Subfamily: Cerambycinae
- Tribe: Ibidionini
- Genus: Gnomidolon; Thomson, 1864

= Gnomidolon =

Genus of beetles

Gnomidolon is a genus of beetles in the family Cerambycidae, containing the following species:

- Gnomidolon amaurum Martins, 1967
- Gnomidolon analogum Martins, 1967
- Gnomidolon basicoeruleum Martins, 1962
- Gnomidolon bellulum Martins, 2006
- Gnomidolon bellum Martins & Galileo, 2002
- Gnomidolon biarcuatum (White, 1855)
- Gnomidolon bipartitum Gounelle, 1909
- Gnomidolon bonsae Martins, 1967
- Gnomidolon bordoni Joly, 1991
- Gnomidolon brethesi Bruch, 1908
- Gnomidolon cingillum Martins, 1967
- Gnomidolon colasi Martins, 1967
- Gnomidolon conjugatum (White, 1855)
- Gnomidolon cruciferum (Gounelle, 1909)
- Gnomidolon denticorne Bates, 1892
- Gnomidolon elegantulum Lameere, 1885
- Gnomidolon fraternum Martins, 1971
- Gnomidolon friedi Clarke, 2007
- Gnomidolon fuchsi Martins, 1971
- Gnomidolon gemuseusi Clarke, 2007
- Gnomidolon glabratum Martins, 1962
- Gnomidolon gounellei Martins, 1967
- Gnomidolon gracile (Gounelle, 1909)
- Gnomidolon grantsaui Martins, 1967
- Gnomidolon guianense (White, 1855)
- Gnomidolon hamatum Linsley, 1935
- Gnomidolon humerale Bates, 1870
- Gnomidolon ignicolor Napp & Martins, 1985
- Gnomidolon incisum Napp & Martins, 1985
- Gnomidolon insigne Martins, 1967
- Gnomidolon insulicola Bates, 1885
- Gnomidolon laetabile Bates, 1885
- Gnomidolon lansbergei (Thomson, 1867)
- Gnomidolon longipenne Martins, 1967
- Gnomidolon maculicorne Gounelle, 1909
- Gnomidolon melanosomum Bates, 1870
- Gnomidolon meridanum Napp & Martins, 1985
- Gnomidolon musivum (Erichson, 1847)
- Gnomidolon nanum Martins, 1962
- Gnomidolon nigritum Martins, 1967
- Gnomidolon nympha Thomson, 1865
- Gnomidolon oeax Thomson, 1867
- Gnomidolon opacicolle Napp & Martins, 1985
- Gnomidolon ornaticolle Martins, 1960
- Gnomidolon pallidicauda Gounelle, 1909
- Gnomidolon parallelum Clarke, 2007
- Gnomidolon peruvianum Martins, 1960
- Gnomidolon picipes Bates, 1870
- Gnomidolon picticorne Martins, 1971
- Gnomidolon pictum (Audinet-Serville, 1834)
- Gnomidolon pilosum Martins, 1962
- Gnomidolon primarium Martins, 1967
- Gnomidolon proseni Martins, 1962
- Gnomidolon proximum Martins, 1960
- Gnomidolon pubicolle Joly, 1990
- Gnomidolon pulchrum Martins, 1960
- Gnomidolon rubricolor Bates, 1870
- Gnomidolon simplex (White, 1855)
- Gnomidolon sinopium Martins, 2006
- Gnomidolon subfasciatum Martins, 1967
- Gnomidolon suturale (White, 1855)
- Gnomidolon sylvarum (Bates, 1892)
- Gnomidolon tomentosum Martins, 1971
- Gnomidolon ubirajarai Joly, 1990
- Gnomidolon varians Gounelle, 1909
- Gnomidolon wappesi Martins, 2006
