= Callia =

Scientific classification
- Kingdom: Animalia
- Phylum: Arthropoda
- Class: Insecta
- Order: Coleoptera
- Suborder: Polyphaga
- Infraorder: Cucujiformia
- Family: Cerambycidae
- Tribe: Calliini
- Genus: Callia; Audinet-Serville, 1835

Genus of beetles

Callia is a genus of longhorn beetles of the subfamily Lamiinae.

- Callia albicornis Bates, 1885
- Callia ambigua Bates, 1885
- Callia annulata Galileo & Martins, 2002
- Callia apyra Martins & al., 2010
- Callia argodi Belon, 1903
- Callia axillaris (Dalman, 1823)
- Callia azurea Audinet-Serville, 1835
- Callia batesi Blackwelder, 1946
- Callia bella Galileo & Martins, 1992
- Callia bicolor (Breuning, 1960)
- Callia boliviana Belon, 1903
- Callia bordoni Martins & al., 2010
- Callia catuaba Martins & al., 2010
- Callia chrysomelina Pascoe, 1859
- Callia comitessa Melzer, 1930
- Callia criocerina Bates, 1866
- Callia cyanea Melzer, 1931
- Callia divisa Galileo & Martins, 2002
- Callia flavipes Zajciw, 1958
- Callia fulvocincta Bates, 1866
- Callia gallegoi Galileo & Martins, 1991
- Callia guyanensis Martins & Galileo, 2008
- Callia halticoides (Bates, 1866)
- Callia leucozonata Lane, 1973
- Callia lineatula Lane, 1973
- Callia lissonota Galileo & Martins, 2002
- Callia lycoides Bates, 1866
- Callia marginata Galileo & Martins, 2002
- Callia metallica Galileo & Martins, 2008
- Callia oby Martins & al., 2010
- Callia pallida Martins & al., 2010
- Callia paraguaya Galileo & Martins, 2002
- Callia potiaiuba Martins & Galileo, 2006
- Callia pulchra Melzer, 1930
- Callia punctata Galileo & Martins, 2002
- Callia purpureipennis (Gistel, 1848)
- Callia rubristerna Galileo & Martins, 1992
- Callia simplex Galileo & Martins, 1991
- Callia terminata Martins & al., 2010
- Callia tomentosa Galileo & Martins, 2002
- Callia tristis Galileo & Martins, 2002
- Callia variabilis Martins & al., 2010
- Callia xanthomera Redtenbacher, 1867
