= Gnomidolon denticorne =

Scientific classification
- Kingdom: Animalia
- Phylum: Arthropoda
- Class: Insecta
- Order: Coleoptera
- Suborder: Polyphaga
- Infraorder: Cucujiformia
- Family: Cerambycidae
- Genus: Gnomidolon
- Species: G. denticorne

Binomial name
- Gnomidolon denticorne Bates, 1892

Species of beetle

Gnomidolon denticorne is a species of beetle in the family Cerambycidae. It was described by Bates in 1892.
