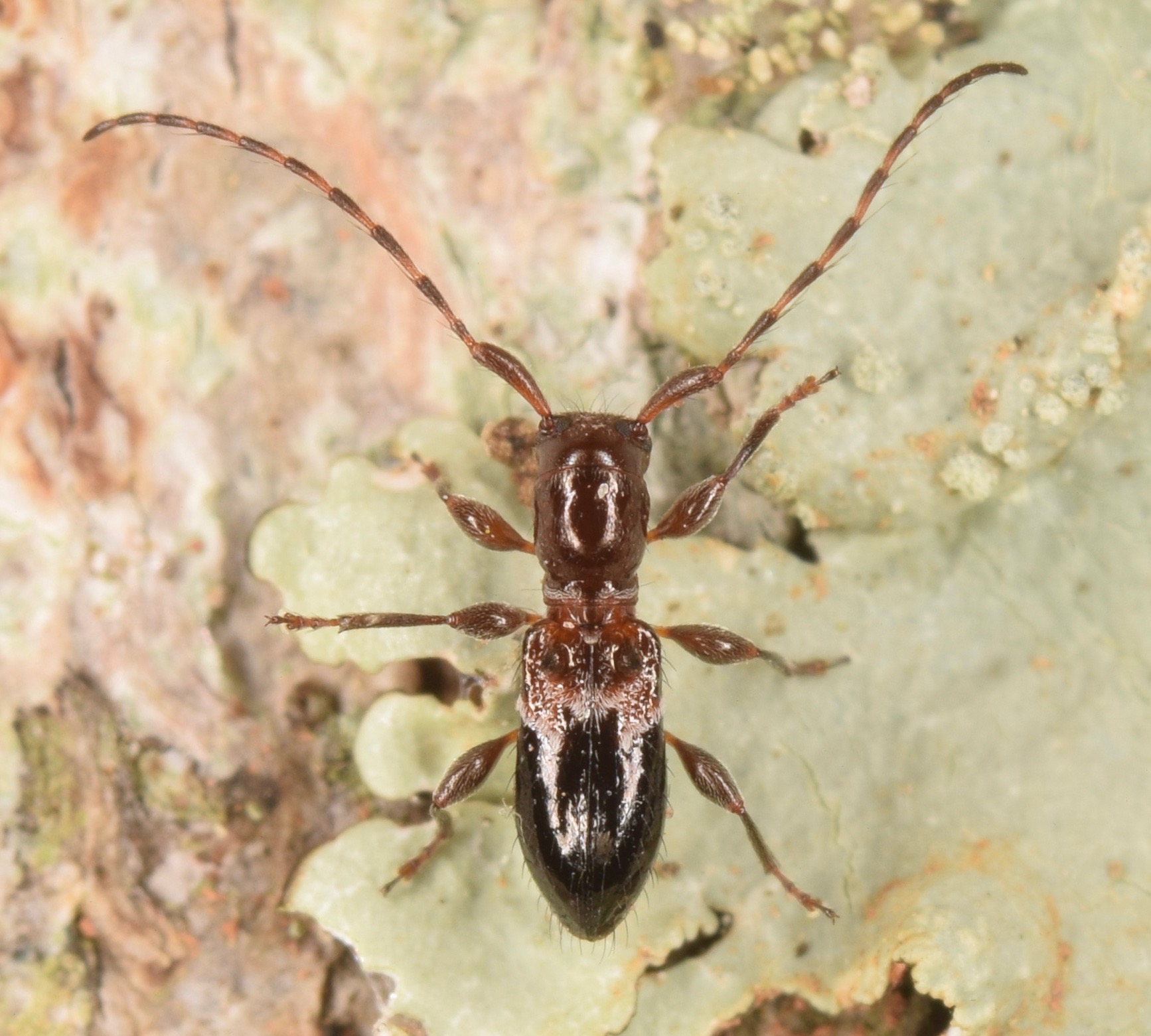
- Cyrtinus pygmaeus

Scientific classification
- Kingdom: Animalia
- Phylum: Arthropoda
- Clade: Pancrustacea
- Class: Insecta
- Order: Coleoptera
- Suborder: Polyphaga
- Infraorder: Cucujiformia
- Family: Cerambycidae
- Subfamily: Lamiinae
- Tribe: Cyrtinini
- Genus: Cyrtinus; LeConte, 1852

= Cyrtinus =

Genus of beetles

Cyrtinus is a genus of longhorn beetles of the subfamily Lamiinae, containing the following species:

- Cyrtinus acunai Fisher, 1935
- Cyrtinus araguaensis Howden, 1973
- Cyrtinus beckeri Howden, 1960
- Cyrtinus bifasciatus Martins & Galileo, 2009
- Cyrtinus bordoni Joly & Rosales, 1990
- Cyrtinus eugeniae Fisher, 1935
- Cyrtinus farri Howden, 1960
- Cyrtinus fauveli (Cameron, 1909)
- Cyrtinus fisheri Wappes, Santos-Silva and Nascimento, 2020
- Cyrtinus granulifrons Howden, 1970
- Cyrtinus hispidus Martins & Galileo, 2009
- Cyrtinus howdeni Wappes, Santos-Silva and Nascimento, 2020
- Cyrtinus hubbardi Fisher, 1926
- Cyrtinus humilis Zayas, 1975
- Cyrtinus jamaicensis Howden, 1970
- Cyrtinus melzeri Martins & Galileo, 2009
- Cyrtinus meridialis Martins & Galileo, 2010
- Cyrtinus mockfordi Howden, 1959
- Cyrtinus mussoi Joly & Rosales, 1990
- Cyrtinus oakleyi Fisher, 1935
- Cyrtinus opacicollis (Bates, 1885)
- Cyrtinus penicillatus (Bates, 1885)
- Cyrtinus pygmaeus (Haldeman, 1847)
- Cyrtinus querci Howden, 1973
- Cyrtinus sandersoni Howden, 1959
- Cyrtinus schwarzi Fisher, 1926
- Cyrtinus striatus Joly & Rosales, 1990
- Cyrtinus subopacus Fisher, 1935
- Cyrtinus umbus Martins & Galileo, 2009
