= Piezophidion =

Scientific classification
- Kingdom: Animalia
- Phylum: Arthropoda
- Class: Insecta
- Order: Coleoptera
- Suborder: Polyphaga
- Infraorder: Cucujiformia
- Family: Cerambycidae
- Subfamily: Cerambycinae
- Tribe: Elaphidiini
- Genus: Piezophidion; Galileo & Martins, 1992

Genus of beetles

Piezophidion is a genus of beetles in the family Cerambycidae, containing the following species:

- Piezophidion bordoni Martins, 2005
- Piezophidion intricatum Galileo & Martins, 1992
- Piezophidion punctatum Martins, 2005
- Piezophidion simplex Martins, 2005
- Piezophidion thoracicum Martins, Galileo & de-Oliveira, 2009
