= Callia chrysomelina =

Scientific classification
- Kingdom: Animalia
- Phylum: Arthropoda
- Class: Insecta
- Order: Coleoptera
- Suborder: Polyphaga
- Infraorder: Cucujiformia
- Family: Cerambycidae
- Genus: Callia
- Species: C. chrysomelina

Binomial name
- Callia chrysomelina Pascoe, 1859

Species of beetle

Callia chrysomelina is a species of beetle in the family Cerambycidae. It was described by Pascoe in 1859. It is known from Brazil and Ecuador.
