= Cyrtinus mussoi =

Scientific classification
- Kingdom: Animalia
- Phylum: Arthropoda
- Clade: Pancrustacea
- Class: Insecta
- Order: Coleoptera
- Suborder: Polyphaga
- Infraorder: Cucujiformia
- Family: Cerambycidae
- Genus: Cyrtinus
- Species: C. mussoi

Binomial name
- Cyrtinus mussoi Joly & Rosales, 1990

Species of beetle

Cyrtinus mussoi is a species of beetle in the family Cerambycidae. It was described by Joly and Rosales in 1990. It is known from Venezuela.
