= Gnomidolon cingillum =

Scientific classification
- Kingdom: Animalia
- Phylum: Arthropoda
- Class: Insecta
- Order: Coleoptera
- Suborder: Polyphaga
- Infraorder: Cucujiformia
- Family: Cerambycidae
- Genus: Gnomidolon
- Species: G. cingillum

Binomial name
- Gnomidolon cingillum Martins, 1967

Species of beetle

Gnomidolon cingillum is a species of beetle in the family Cerambycidae. It was described by Martins in 1967.
