= Callia potiaiuba =

Scientific classification
- Kingdom: Animalia
- Phylum: Arthropoda
- Class: Insecta
- Order: Coleoptera
- Suborder: Polyphaga
- Infraorder: Cucujiformia
- Family: Cerambycidae
- Genus: Callia
- Species: C. potiaiuba

Binomial name
- Callia potiaiuba Martins & Galileo, 2006

Species of beetle

Callia potiaiuba is a species of beetle in the family Cerambycidae. It was described by Martins and Galileo in 2006. It is known from Bolivia and Brazil.
