= Callia comitessa =

Scientific classification
- Kingdom: Animalia
- Phylum: Arthropoda
- Class: Insecta
- Order: Coleoptera
- Suborder: Polyphaga
- Infraorder: Cucujiformia
- Family: Cerambycidae
- Genus: Callia
- Species: C. comitessa

Binomial name
- Callia comitessa Melzer, 1930

Species of beetle

Callia comitessa is a species of beetle in the family Cerambycidae. It was described by Melzer in 1930. It is known from Brazil.
