= Cyrtinus meridialis =

Scientific classification
- Kingdom: Animalia
- Phylum: Arthropoda
- Clade: Pancrustacea
- Class: Insecta
- Order: Coleoptera
- Suborder: Polyphaga
- Infraorder: Cucujiformia
- Family: Cerambycidae
- Genus: Cyrtinus
- Species: C. meridialis

Binomial name
- Cyrtinus meridialis Martins & Galileo, 2010

Species of beetle

Cyrtinus meridialis is a species of beetle in the family Cerambycidae. It was described by Martins and Galileo in 2010.
