= Trichillurges meridanus =

Scientific classification
- Kingdom: Animalia
- Phylum: Arthropoda
- Class: Insecta
- Order: Coleoptera
- Suborder: Polyphaga
- Infraorder: Cucujiformia
- Family: Cerambycidae
- Genus: Trichillurges
- Species: T. meridanus

Binomial name
- Trichillurges meridanus Monné, 1990

Species of beetle

Trichillurges meridanus is a species of beetle in the family Cerambycidae. It was described by Monné in 1990.
