= Cyrtinus oakleyi =

Scientific classification
- Kingdom: Animalia
- Phylum: Arthropoda
- Clade: Pancrustacea
- Class: Insecta
- Order: Coleoptera
- Suborder: Polyphaga
- Infraorder: Cucujiformia
- Family: Cerambycidae
- Genus: Cyrtinus
- Species: C. oakleyi

Binomial name
- Cyrtinus oakleyi Fisher, 1935

Species of beetle

Cyrtinus oakleyi is a species of beetle in the family Cerambycidae. It was described by Fisher in 1935. It is known from Puerto Rico.
