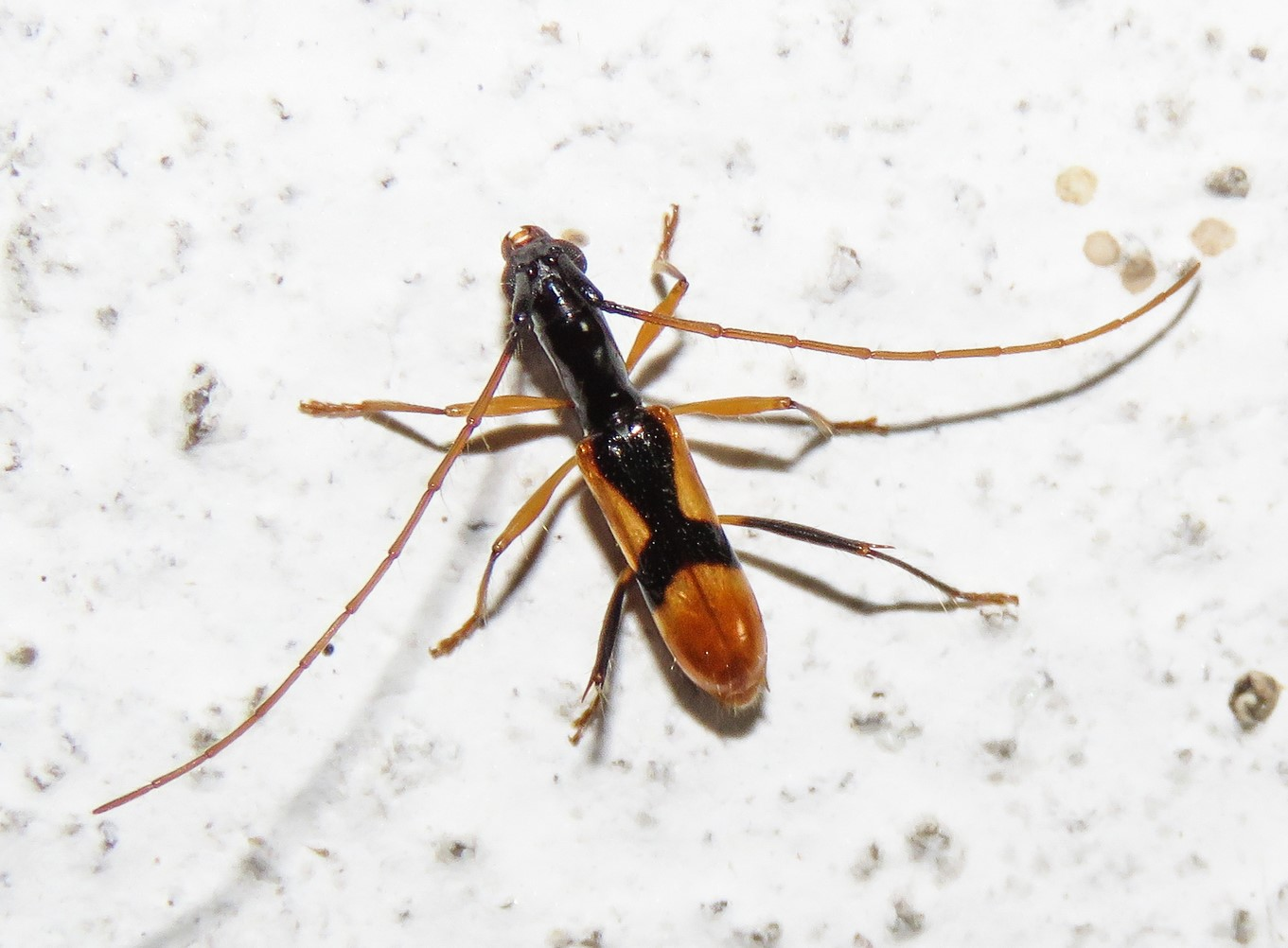

Scientific classification
- Kingdom: Animalia
- Phylum: Arthropoda
- Class: Insecta
- Order: Coleoptera
- Suborder: Polyphaga
- Infraorder: Cucujiformia
- Family: Cerambycidae
- Genus: Gnomidolon
- Species: G. elegantulum

Binomial name
- Gnomidolon elegantulum Lameere, 1885

= Gnomidolon elegantulum =

Species of beetle

Gnomidolon elegantulum is a species of beetle in the family Cerambycidae. It was described by Lameere in 1885.
