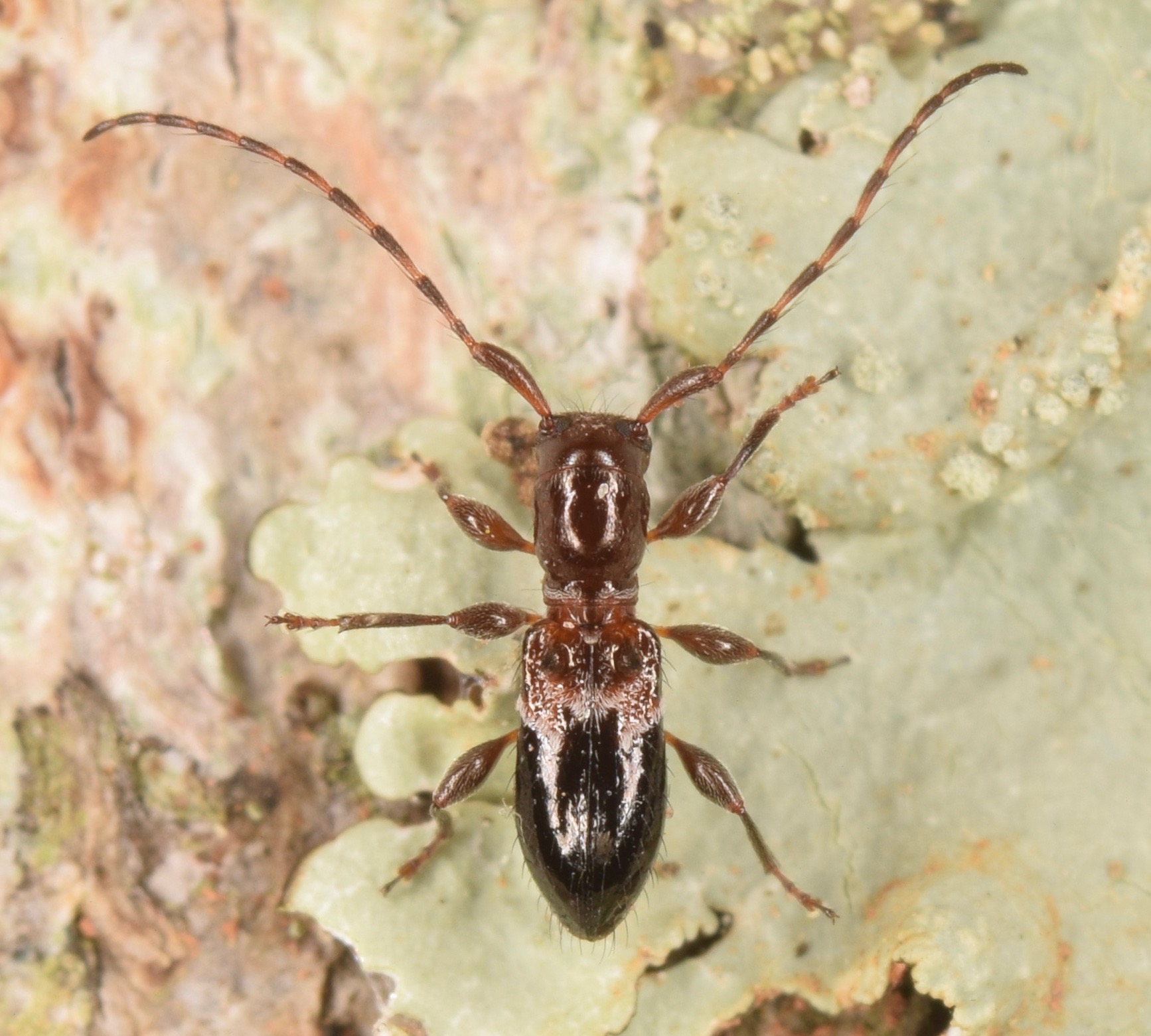

Scientific classification
- Kingdom: Animalia
- Phylum: Arthropoda
- Clade: Pancrustacea
- Class: Insecta
- Order: Coleoptera
- Suborder: Polyphaga
- Infraorder: Cucujiformia
- Family: Cerambycidae
- Genus: Cyrtinus
- Species: C. pygmaeus

Binomial name
- Cyrtinus pygmaeus (Haldeman, 1847)

= Cyrtinus pygmaeus =

Species of beetle

Cyrtinus pygmaeus is a species of beetle in the family Cerambycidae. It was described by Haldeman in 1847. It is known from the United States.
