= Lepturgotrichona cubaecola =

Scientific classification
- Kingdom: Animalia
- Phylum: Arthropoda
- Class: Insecta
- Order: Coleoptera
- Suborder: Polyphaga
- Infraorder: Cucujiformia
- Family: Cerambycidae
- Genus: Lepturgotrichona
- Species: L. cubaecola

Binomial name
- Lepturgotrichona cubaecola (Fisher, 1942)

Species of beetle

Lepturgotrichona cubaecola is a species of beetle in the family Cerambycidae. It was described by Fisher in 1942.
