= Trichillurges puncticollis =

Scientific classification
- Kingdom: Animalia
- Phylum: Arthropoda
- Clade: Pancrustacea
- Class: Insecta
- Order: Coleoptera
- Suborder: Polyphaga
- Infraorder: Cucujiformia
- Family: Cerambycidae
- Genus: Trichillurges
- Species: T. puncticollis

Binomial name
- Trichillurges puncticollis Vlasak & Santos-Silva, 2026

Species of beetle

Trichillurges puncticollis is a species of beetle of the family Cerambycidae. It is found in Ecuador.

== Description ==
Adults reach a length of about 3.65–5.55 mm (0.144–0.219 in). The head capsule is light brown, while the ventral mouthparts are mostly reddish brown. The pronotum is reddish brown anteriorly and posteriorly, but lighter laterally on the posterior region, dark brown on the wide central area, and brown on the remaining surface. The sides and ventral surface of the prothorax and ventral surface of the meso- and metathorax are dark brown. The scutellum is dark brown laterally and light brown centrally. The basal two-thirds of the elytra is brown on the wide central area near the suture and dark brown close to suture. The remaining surface has irregular, both light-brown and dull yellowish-brown areas, with the light-brown areas partially greenish brown depending on the light intensity, with irregular dark-brown maculae interspersed. The posterior third has irregular, dull yellowish-brown and light greenish-brown areas and irregular dark brown maculae interspersed.

== Etymology ==
The species name is derived from the Latin punctum (meaning puncture) and collis (meaning neck) and refers to the densely punctate pronotum.
