= Gnomidolon lansbergei =

Scientific classification
- Kingdom: Animalia
- Phylum: Arthropoda
- Class: Insecta
- Order: Coleoptera
- Suborder: Polyphaga
- Infraorder: Cucujiformia
- Family: Cerambycidae
- Genus: Gnomidolon
- Species: G. lansbergei

Binomial name
- Gnomidolon lansbergei (Thomson, 1867)

Species of beetle

Gnomidolon lansbergei is a species of beetle in the family Cerambycidae. It was described by Thomson in 1867.
