= Gnomidolon bellum =

Scientific classification
- Kingdom: Animalia
- Phylum: Arthropoda
- Class: Insecta
- Order: Coleoptera
- Suborder: Polyphaga
- Infraorder: Cucujiformia
- Family: Cerambycidae
- Genus: Gnomidolon
- Species: G. bellum

Binomial name
- Gnomidolon bellum Martins & Galileo, 2002

Species of beetle

Gnomidolon bellum is a species of beetle in the family Cerambycidae. It was described by Martins and Galileo in 2002.
