= Cyrtinus hubbardi =

Scientific classification
- Kingdom: Animalia
- Phylum: Arthropoda
- Clade: Pancrustacea
- Class: Insecta
- Order: Coleoptera
- Suborder: Polyphaga
- Infraorder: Cucujiformia
- Family: Cerambycidae
- Genus: Cyrtinus
- Species: C. hubbardi

Binomial name
- Cyrtinus hubbardi Fisher, 1926

Species of beetle

Cyrtinus hubbardi is a species of beetle in the family Cerambycidae. It was described by Fisher in 1926. It is known from Montserrat, Martinique, and Guadeloupe. It feeds on Ice cream bean.
