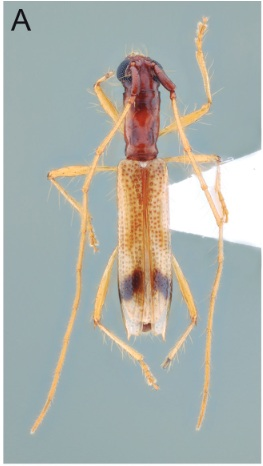

Scientific classification
- Kingdom: Animalia
- Phylum: Arthropoda
- Clade: Pancrustacea
- Class: Insecta
- Order: Coleoptera
- Suborder: Polyphaga
- Infraorder: Cucujiformia
- Family: Cerambycidae
- Genus: Gnomidolon
- Species: G. varians

Binomial name
- Gnomidolon varians Gounelle, 1909

Synonyms
- Gnomidolon addictum Melzer, 1935; Gnomidolon micans Fisher, 1937; Gnomidolon micans v. brunneicaudatum Fisher, 1937

= Gnomidolon varians =

Species of beetle

Gnomidolon varians is a species of beetle in the family Cerambycidae. It was described by Gounelle in 1909. It is found in Brazil, Bolivia, Paraguay, Argentina and Uruguay.
