= Bordone =

Bordone may refer to:

== People ==
- Beatrice Bordone (born 1951), Italian costume designer
- Benedetto Bordone (died 1531), Italian miniaturist and cartographer
- Paris Bordone (1500–1571), Italian painter
- Richard P. Bordone (1930–2007), U.S. Navy captain and aviator
- Susanna Bordone (born 1981), Italian eventing and dressage rider

== Other uses ==
- Drone (sound), in Italian usage
  - Bourdon (organ pipe), in Italian usage
  - Falso bordone, musical recitation style of the 15th–18th centuries
  - Viola di bordone, bowed string instrument in use until the 18th century
- Madonna del Bordone, 13th-century panel painting in Siena, Italy

== See also ==
- Bordoni
