= Callia argodi =

Scientific classification
- Kingdom: Animalia
- Phylum: Arthropoda
- Class: Insecta
- Order: Coleoptera
- Suborder: Polyphaga
- Infraorder: Cucujiformia
- Family: Cerambycidae
- Genus: Callia
- Species: C. argodi

Binomial name
- Callia argodi Belon, 1903

Species of beetle

Callia argodi is a species of beetle in the family Cerambycidae. It was described by Belon in 1903. It is known from Bolivia and Ecuador.
