= Piezophidion intricatum =

Scientific classification
- Kingdom: Animalia
- Phylum: Arthropoda
- Class: Insecta
- Order: Coleoptera
- Suborder: Polyphaga
- Infraorder: Cucujiformia
- Family: Cerambycidae
- Genus: Piezophidion
- Species: P. intricatum

Binomial name
- Piezophidion intricatum Galileo & Martins, 1992

Species of beetle

Piezophidion intricatum is a species of beetle in the family Cerambycidae. It was described by Galileo and Martins in 1992.
