= Gnomidolon ignicolor =

Scientific classification
- Kingdom: Animalia
- Phylum: Arthropoda
- Class: Insecta
- Order: Coleoptera
- Suborder: Polyphaga
- Infraorder: Cucujiformia
- Family: Cerambycidae
- Genus: Gnomidolon
- Species: G. ignicolor

Binomial name
- Gnomidolon ignicolor Napp & Martins, 1985

Species of beetle

Gnomidolon ignicolor is a species of beetle in the family Cerambycidae. It was described by Napp and Martins in 1985.
