= Gnomidolon proximum =

Scientific classification
- Kingdom: Animalia
- Phylum: Arthropoda
- Class: Insecta
- Order: Coleoptera
- Suborder: Polyphaga
- Infraorder: Cucujiformia
- Family: Cerambycidae
- Genus: Gnomidolon
- Species: G. proximum

Binomial name
- Gnomidolon proximum Martins, 1960

Species of beetle

Gnomidolon proximum is a species of beetle in the family Cerambycidae. It was described by Martins in 1960.
