= Piezophidion simplex =

Scientific classification
- Kingdom: Animalia
- Phylum: Arthropoda
- Class: Insecta
- Order: Coleoptera
- Suborder: Polyphaga
- Infraorder: Cucujiformia
- Family: Cerambycidae
- Genus: Piezophidion
- Species: P. simplex

Binomial name
- Piezophidion simplex Martins, 2005

Species of beetle

Piezophidion simplex is a species of beetle in the family Cerambycidae. It was described by Martins in 2005.
