= Callia fulvocincta =

Scientific classification
- Kingdom: Animalia
- Phylum: Arthropoda
- Class: Insecta
- Order: Coleoptera
- Suborder: Polyphaga
- Infraorder: Cucujiformia
- Family: Cerambycidae
- Genus: Callia
- Species: C. fulvocincta

Binomial name
- Callia fulvocincta Bates, 1866

Species of beetle

Callia fulvocincta is a species of beetle in the family Cerambycidae. It was described by Bates in 1866. It is known from Mexico, Guatemala, Nicaragua, Ecuador, Honduras, Panama, Peru, and Brazil.
