= Trichillurges brasiliensis =

Scientific classification
- Kingdom: Animalia
- Phylum: Arthropoda
- Clade: Pancrustacea
- Class: Insecta
- Order: Coleoptera
- Suborder: Polyphaga
- Infraorder: Cucujiformia
- Family: Cerambycidae
- Genus: Trichillurges
- Species: T. brasiliensis

Binomial name
- Trichillurges brasiliensis (Melzer, 1935)

Species of beetle

Trichillurges brasiliensis is a species of beetle in the family Cerambycidae. It was described by Melzer in 1935. It is found in Brazil (Rio de Janeiro, São Paulo, Paraná, Santa Catarina, Rio Grande do Sul) and Paraguay (Guairá, Itapúa).
