= Callia leucozonata =

Scientific classification
- Kingdom: Animalia
- Phylum: Arthropoda
- Class: Insecta
- Order: Coleoptera
- Suborder: Polyphaga
- Infraorder: Cucujiformia
- Family: Cerambycidae
- Genus: Callia
- Species: C. leucozonata

Binomial name
- Callia leucozonata Lane, 1973

Species of beetle

Callia leucozonata is a species of beetle in the family Cerambycidae. It was described by Lane in 1973. It is known from Ecuador.
