= Gnomidolon picipes =

Scientific classification
- Kingdom: Animalia
- Phylum: Arthropoda
- Class: Insecta
- Order: Coleoptera
- Suborder: Polyphaga
- Infraorder: Cucujiformia
- Family: Cerambycidae
- Genus: Gnomidolon
- Species: G. picipes

Binomial name
- Gnomidolon picipes Bates, 1870

Species of beetle

Gnomidolon picipes is a species of beetle in the family Cerambycidae. It was described by Bates in 1870.
