= Callia tristis =

Scientific classification
- Kingdom: Animalia
- Phylum: Arthropoda
- Class: Insecta
- Order: Coleoptera
- Suborder: Polyphaga
- Infraorder: Cucujiformia
- Family: Cerambycidae
- Genus: Callia
- Species: C. tristis

Binomial name
- Callia tristis Galileo & Martins, 2002

Species of beetle

Callia tristis is a species of beetle in the family Cerambycidae. It was described by Galileo and Martins in 2002. It is known from Bolivia.
