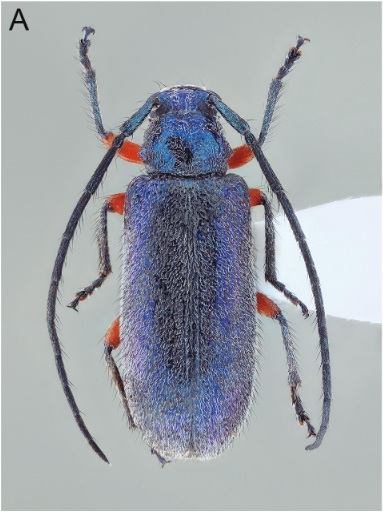

Scientific classification
- Kingdom: Animalia
- Phylum: Arthropoda
- Clade: Pancrustacea
- Class: Insecta
- Order: Coleoptera
- Suborder: Polyphaga
- Infraorder: Cucujiformia
- Family: Cerambycidae
- Genus: Callia
- Species: C. xanthomera

Binomial name
- Callia xanthomera Redtenbacher, 1867

= Callia xanthomera =

Species of beetle

Callia xanthomera is a species of beetle in the family Cerambycidae. It was described by Redtenbacher in 1867. It is known from Argentina, Paraguay, and Brazil.
