= Callia criocerina =

Scientific classification
- Kingdom: Animalia
- Phylum: Arthropoda
- Class: Insecta
- Order: Coleoptera
- Suborder: Polyphaga
- Infraorder: Cucujiformia
- Family: Cerambycidae
- Genus: Callia
- Species: C. criocerina

Binomial name
- Callia criocerina Bates, 1866

Species of beetle

Callia criocerina is a species of beetle in the family Cerambycidae. It was described by Bates in 1866. It is known from Brazil.
