= Trichillurges =

Scientific classification
- Kingdom: Animalia
- Phylum: Arthropoda
- Clade: Pancrustacea
- Class: Insecta
- Order: Coleoptera
- Suborder: Polyphaga
- Infraorder: Cucujiformia
- Family: Cerambycidae
- Tribe: Acanthocinini
- Genus: Trichillurges; Gilmour, 1961

Genus of beetles

Trichillurges is a genus of beetles in the family Cerambycidae, containing the following species:

- Trichillurges bordoni Monné, 1990
- Trichillurges brasiliensis (Melzer, 1935)
- Trichillurges conspersus Monné, 1990
- Trichillurges maculatus Martins & Monné, 1974
- Trichillurges meridanus Monné, 1990
- Trichillurges puncticollis Vlasak & Santos-Silva, 2026
- Trichillurges olivaceus Monné, 1990
- Trichillurges simplex Martins & Monné, 1974
