= Callia bicolor =

Scientific classification
- Kingdom: Animalia
- Phylum: Arthropoda
- Class: Insecta
- Order: Coleoptera
- Suborder: Polyphaga
- Infraorder: Cucujiformia
- Family: Cerambycidae
- Genus: Callia
- Species: C. bicolor

Binomial name
- Callia bicolor (Breuning, 1960)

Synonyms
- Estola bicolor Breuning, 1960

Species of beetle

Callia bicolor is a species of beetle in the family Cerambycidae. It was described by Breuning in 1960. It is known from French Guiana.
