= Gnomidolon pallidicauda =

Scientific classification
- Kingdom: Animalia
- Phylum: Arthropoda
- Clade: Pancrustacea
- Class: Insecta
- Order: Coleoptera
- Suborder: Polyphaga
- Infraorder: Cucujiformia
- Family: Cerambycidae
- Genus: Gnomidolon
- Species: G. pallidicauda

Binomial name
- Gnomidolon pallidicauda Gounelle, 1909

Species of beetle

Gnomidolon pallidicauda is a species of beetle in the family Cerambycidae. It was described by Gounelle in 1909. It is found in Brazil (Acre, Mato Grosso, Mato Grosso do Sul, Goiás, Maranhão, Bahia, Minas Gerais, Espírito Santo, Rio de Janeiro, São Paulo, Paraná, Santa Catarina, Rio Grande do Sul), Peru, Bolivia (Beni, Santa Cruz) and Paraguay.
