= Obianuju =

Igbo name

- Gender: Female
- Language: Igbo

Origin
- Origin: Nigeria
- Meaning: One who came into an abundance of wealth
- Region of origin: Southeast

Other names
- Short form: Uju
- Related names: Obiageli

Obianuju // is a female Igbo given name. It means "one who came into abundance", or can be a compressed form form of the expression ọ bịa na uju aku, which means, “one who came into an abundance of wealth”. It is thus part of a wide tradition of circumstance names across Africa. The common diminutive form is "Uju".

== Notable people with the name ==
- Obianuju Catherine Udeh professionally known as DJ Switch
- Catherine Obianuju Acholonu, Nigerian writer
- Obianuju Ekeocha, Nigerian biomedical scientist
- Uju Okeke, Nigerian actress
