= Gnomidolon gemuseusi =

Scientific classification
- Kingdom: Animalia
- Phylum: Arthropoda
- Class: Insecta
- Order: Coleoptera
- Suborder: Polyphaga
- Infraorder: Cucujiformia
- Family: Cerambycidae
- Genus: Gnomidolon
- Species: G. gemuseusi

Binomial name
- Gnomidolon gemuseusi Clarke, 2007

Species of beetle

Gnomidolon gemuseusi is a species of beetle in the family Cerambycidae. It was described by Clarke in 2007.
