= Gnomidolon pubicolle =

Scientific classification
- Kingdom: Animalia
- Phylum: Arthropoda
- Class: Insecta
- Order: Coleoptera
- Suborder: Polyphaga
- Infraorder: Cucujiformia
- Family: Cerambycidae
- Genus: Gnomidolon
- Species: G. pubicolle

Binomial name
- Gnomidolon pubicolle Joly, 1990

Species of beetle

Gnomidolon pubicolle is a species of beetle in the family Cerambycidae. It was described by Joly in 1990.
