= Gnomidolon humerale =

Scientific classification
- Kingdom: Animalia
- Phylum: Arthropoda
- Class: Insecta
- Order: Coleoptera
- Suborder: Polyphaga
- Infraorder: Cucujiformia
- Family: Cerambycidae
- Genus: Gnomidolon
- Species: G. humerale

Binomial name
- Gnomidolon humerale Bates, 1870

Species of beetle

Gnomidolon humerale is a species of beetle in the family Cerambycidae. It was described by Bates in 1870.
