= Callia batesi =

Scientific classification
- Kingdom: Animalia
- Phylum: Arthropoda
- Clade: Pancrustacea
- Class: Insecta
- Order: Coleoptera
- Suborder: Polyphaga
- Infraorder: Cucujiformia
- Family: Cerambycidae
- Genus: Callia
- Species: C. batesi

Binomial name
- Callia batesi Blackwelder, 1946

Species of beetle

Callia batesi is a species of beetle in the family Cerambycidae. It was described by Blackwelder in 1946. It is found in Brazil (Espírito Santo, Paraná, Rio de Janeiro, São Paulo).
