= Callia purpureipennis =

Scientific classification
- Kingdom: Animalia
- Phylum: Arthropoda
- Class: Insecta
- Order: Coleoptera
- Suborder: Polyphaga
- Infraorder: Cucujiformia
- Family: Cerambycidae
- Genus: Callia
- Species: C. purpureipennis

Binomial name
- Callia purpureipennis (Gistel, 1848)

Species of beetle

Callia purpureipennis is a species of beetle in the family Cerambycidae. The beetle was first described by Johannes von Nepomuk Franz Xaver Gistel in 1848. Its known habitat is in Brazil.
