= Callia paraguaya =

Scientific classification
- Kingdom: Animalia
- Phylum: Arthropoda
- Clade: Pancrustacea
- Class: Insecta
- Order: Coleoptera
- Suborder: Polyphaga
- Infraorder: Cucujiformia
- Family: Cerambycidae
- Genus: Callia
- Species: C. paraguaya

Binomial name
- Callia paraguaya Galileo & Martins, 2002

Species of beetle

Callia paraguaya is a species of beetle in the family Cerambycidae. It was described by Galileo and Martins in 2002. It is known from Paraguay (Caazapá) and Brazil (Paraná).
