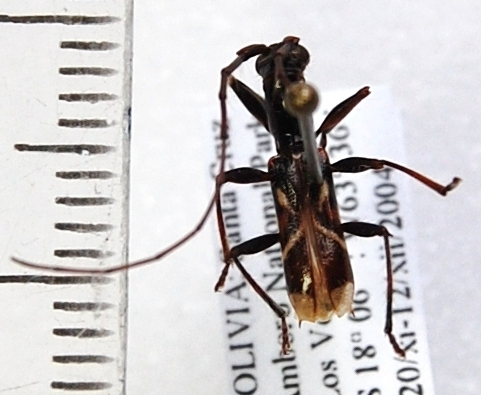

Scientific classification
- Kingdom: Animalia
- Phylum: Arthropoda
- Class: Insecta
- Order: Coleoptera
- Suborder: Polyphaga
- Infraorder: Cucujiformia
- Family: Cerambycidae
- Genus: Gnomidolon
- Species: G. musivum

Binomial name
- Gnomidolon musivum (Erichson, 1847)

= Gnomidolon musivum =

Species of beetle

Gnomidolon musivum is a species of beetle found in the Cerambycidae family. It was described by Wilhelm Ferdinand Erichson in 1847.
