= Gnomidolon oeax =

Scientific classification
- Kingdom: Animalia
- Phylum: Arthropoda
- Class: Insecta
- Order: Coleoptera
- Suborder: Polyphaga
- Infraorder: Cucujiformia
- Family: Cerambycidae
- Genus: Gnomidolon
- Species: G. oeax

Binomial name
- Gnomidolon oeax Thomson, 1867

Species of beetle

Gnomidolon oeax is a species of beetle in the family Cerambycidae. It was described by Thomson in 1867.
