= Lepturgotrichona stigmatica =

Scientific classification
- Kingdom: Animalia
- Phylum: Arthropoda
- Class: Insecta
- Order: Coleoptera
- Suborder: Polyphaga
- Infraorder: Cucujiformia
- Family: Cerambycidae
- Genus: Lepturgotrichona
- Species: L. stigmatica

Binomial name
- Lepturgotrichona stigmatica (Bates, 1881)

Species of beetle

Lepturgotrichona stigmatica is a species of beetle in the family Cerambycidae. It was described by Bates in 1881.
