= Gnomidolon tomentosum =

Scientific classification
- Kingdom: Animalia
- Phylum: Arthropoda
- Class: Insecta
- Order: Coleoptera
- Suborder: Polyphaga
- Infraorder: Cucujiformia
- Family: Cerambycidae
- Genus: Gnomidolon
- Species: G. tomentosum

Binomial name
- Gnomidolon tomentosum Martins, 1971

Species of beetle

Gnomidolon tomentosum is a species of beetle in the family Cerambycidae. It was described by Martins in 1971.
