= Cyrtinus fauveli =

Scientific classification
- Kingdom: Animalia
- Phylum: Arthropoda
- Clade: Pancrustacea
- Class: Insecta
- Order: Coleoptera
- Suborder: Polyphaga
- Infraorder: Cucujiformia
- Family: Cerambycidae
- Genus: Cyrtinus
- Species: C. fauveli

Binomial name
- Cyrtinus fauveli (Cameron, 1909)

Species of beetle

Cyrtinus fauveli is a species of beetle in the family Cerambycidae. It was described by Cameron in 1909. It is known from Haiti.
