= Gnomidolon pilosum =

Scientific classification
- Kingdom: Animalia
- Phylum: Arthropoda
- Class: Insecta
- Order: Coleoptera
- Suborder: Polyphaga
- Infraorder: Cucujiformia
- Family: Cerambycidae
- Genus: Gnomidolon
- Species: G. pilosum

Binomial name
- Gnomidolon pilosum Martins, 1962

Species of beetle

Gnomidolon pilosum is a species of beetle in the family Cerambycidae. It was described by Martins in 1962.
