= Callia axillaris =

Scientific classification
- Kingdom: Animalia
- Phylum: Arthropoda
- Class: Insecta
- Order: Coleoptera
- Suborder: Polyphaga
- Infraorder: Cucujiformia
- Family: Cerambycidae
- Genus: Callia
- Species: C. axillaris

Binomial name
- Callia axillaris (Dalman, 1823)

Synonyms
- Callia flavofemorata Redtenbacher, 1868; Lamia axillaris Dalman, 1823

Species of beetle

Callia axillaris is a species of beetle in the family Cerambycidae. It was described by Johan Wilhelm Dalman in 1823. It is known from Brazil.
