= Simona Bordoni =

Environmental scientist

- Born: 1972 (age 53–54)
- Education: University of California, Los Angeles
- Scientific career
- Fields: Climate science, Atmospheric physics
- Workplaces: California Institute of Technology
- Thesis: “On the role of eddies in monsoonal circulations: observations and theory” (2007)
- Doctoral advisor: Bjorn Stevens
- Website: web.gps.caltech.edu/~bordoni/

Simona Bordoni (born 1972) is an Italian professor of atmospheric physics who leads a research group at the University of Trento since 2019. She studies atmospheric dynamics, with a special emphasis on understanding the coupling between larger-scale circulations and the hydrological cycle, in particular in tropical monsoon systems.

== Career ==
Simona Bordoni attended the University of Rome Tor Vergata in Italy where she earned a Laurea in Physics in 1996. Bordoni received her M.Sc in Atmospheric Sciences from UCLA in 2003, and her PhD in Atmospheric and Oceanic Sciences from UCLA in 2007. She was then an assistant professor (2009-2017) and subsequently a full professor of environmental science and engineering (2017-2019) at the California Institute of Technology.

Bordoni and Tapio Schneider have a highly cited paper on the onset of the Asian monsoon that used an idealised climate model to show that the monsoon is a rapid transition between two circulation regions. Simone has also worked with Salvatore Pascale to study the weakening of the North American monsoon and its consequences for regional water resources. Her analysis of ocean winds over the Gulf of California and northeast Pacific Ocean identified that the onset of the summer season is accompanied by a seasonal reversal of the wind flow along the Gulf.

== Areas of interest ==
Monsoons, Tropical dynamics, Climate Dynamics Interactions between mesoscale and large-scale circulations

== Awards ==
- 2025 American Meteorological Society Haurwitz Memorial Lecture Award
- 2021 Award for Excellence in Teaching, DICAM, University of Trento
- 2014 ISSNAF (Italian Scientists and Scholars of North America Foundation) Young Scientist Award in Environmental Sciences
- 2009 James R. Holton Junior Scientist Award
