= Callia oby =

Scientific classification
- Kingdom: Animalia
- Phylum: Arthropoda
- Class: Insecta
- Order: Coleoptera
- Suborder: Polyphaga
- Infraorder: Cucujiformia
- Family: Cerambycidae
- Genus: Callia
- Species: C. oby

Binomial name
- Callia oby Martins & al., 2010

Species of beetle

Callia oby is a species of beetle in the family Cerambycidae. It was described by Martins and al. in 2010. It is known from Brazil.
