= Ernesta Bordoni =

Italian convicted murderer (born 1873)

Ernesta Bordoni (born 1873 in Bologna, Italy) was an alleged prostitute and convicted murderer. Her life, crime, and physiological characteristics, as represented by Italian historian Guglielmo Ferrero under the teachings of criminologist Cesare Lombroso, were utilized as evidence for the theory of Anthropological criminology. Her case has been later re-analyzed in argument against the merits of anthropological or Biological Criminology. Her story is of importance to the field of criminology and its conflicting schools of thought.

== Early life and context ==
Bordoni was born in 1873, the exact date of her birth is unknown. She lived in the Porta San Vitale sector of Bologna, Italy in a poor neighborhood. By the age of 18, she officially worked as a seamstress, but has been also described as a prostitute.

Prostitution at this time in Italy was legalized, but women were subject to strict regulations and were often victims of abuse. To avoid interference from the state and the confines of the brothel system, many women— Bordoni included— chose to operate independently, albeit illegally.

== Murder of Zannino ==
On March 1, 1891, Bordoni murdered her ex-boyfriend, a man identified only as Zannino, by stabbing him with a kitchen knife. She was taken into custody and brought to trial, where she claimed the murder was in self defense. In an interview with the prosecutor, Bordoni stated that, in the time leading up to the murder, Zannino publicly slandered and coerced her. She claimed the murder was an impulsive act, brought upon by a conflict wherein he hit her across the face.

Conflicting accounts of the murder suggest that Bordoni's actions were premeditated. Eyewitnesses claim she borrowed the murder weapon from a neighbor and brought it to the interaction with Zannino. Additionally, some witnesses believed Bordoni to have initiated the conflict when they heard her audibly threatening to kill Zannino.

Bordoni's half-brother, Rudolph Ferri, was also implicated in the murder. It has been claimed that he had relations with Bordoni, and encouraged her to murder her ex-lover. In trial, he was found guilty of inciting this murder and sentenced to 15 years in prison; Bordoni, although she committed the murder, only saw a 4-year sentence.

After her time in prison, Bordoni disappears from the historical record. The context of her death is unknown.

== Bordoni and Ferrero ==
Between the years of 1890 and 1893, Guglielmo Ferrero, et al. wrote Il Mondo Criminale Italiano, a book documenting various case studies of Italian criminals— Bordoni being one of them. Herein, Ferrero argues that Bordoni's crime was the result of an inherent biological predisposition to crime.

Ferrero, based on Cesare Lombroso's theory of criminology, identified particular traits in women that suggest potential criminal disposition. In Bordoni specifically, he claimed her skull and forehead were smaller than average, suggesting criminal tendencies. Furthermore, he suggested her involvement in prostitution created an additional layer of moral depravity in her psyche that made her more susceptible to committing violent acts.
