= Obiageli =

- Gender: Female
- Language: Igbo

Origin
- Meaning: One who has come to reap wealth
- Region of origin: Southeast Nigeria

Other names
- Variant form: Obiageri
- Short form: Oby
- Related names: Obianuju

Obiageli // or Obiageri is a traditional female given name of Igbo origin. It is a condensed form of the expression Ọbịa-ga-eli-àkụ̀, meaning "one who has come to reap wealth". It is thus given to girls who are born in a time of prosperity. It is often shortened to Oby. In Southern Igbo dialects, ga-eli is rendered as ga-eri (to eat).

Notable people with the name include:

- Obiageri Amaechi (born 1999), American-born Nigerian discus thrower
- Oby Edoga-Solaja (born 1962), Nigerian badminton player and administrator
- Oby Ezekwesili (born 1963), Chartered accountant and politician
- Oby Kechere, Actress and film director
- Oby Onyioha, Singer and songwriter
