= Paolo Bordoni =

Italian footballer

Personal information
- Date of birth: 23 February 1963 (age 63)
- Place of birth: Sondrio, Italy
- Height: 1.80 m (5 ft 11 in)
- Position: Goalkeeper

Youth career
- Atalanta

Senior career*
Years	Team	Apps	(Gls)
1979–1985	Atalanta	0	(0)
1980–1981	→ Sondrio (loan)	0	(0)
1985–1990	Piacenza	148	(0)
1990–1997	Lodigiani	228	(0)
1997–2001	Pescara	127	(0)
2001–2002	Giulianova	0	(0)
Total		503	(0)

Managerial career
- 2002–2003: Giulianova (goalkeepers coach)
- 2003–2018: RC Angolana (goalkeepers coach)
- 2018–2019: Francavilla (goalkeepers coach)
- * Club domestic league appearances and goals

Paolo Bordoni (born 23 February 1963) is an Italian former professional footballer who played as a goalkeeper.

== Career ==
Revealed by Atalanta's youth sectors, Bordoni remained at the club from 1979 to 1985, being part of the 1983–84 Serie B title. For Piacenza, Bordoni was part of the champion squad of the 1986 Memorial Gigi Peronace Cup and of the 1986–87 Serie C1. Bordoni also had long spells at Lodigiani and Pescara, making 503 appearances in series C1 and B. He ended his career at Giulianova, where he also began a career as a goalkeepers coach.

== Honours ==
Atalanta

- Serie B: 1983–84

Piacenza

- Serie C1: 1986–87 (group A)
- Coppa Memorial Gigi Peronace: 1986
