= Gnomidolon bordoni =

Scientific classification
- Kingdom: Animalia
- Phylum: Arthropoda
- Class: Insecta
- Order: Coleoptera
- Suborder: Polyphaga
- Infraorder: Cucujiformia
- Family: Cerambycidae
- Genus: Gnomidolon
- Species: G. bordoni

Binomial name
- Gnomidolon bordoni Joly, 1991

Species of beetle

Gnomidolon bordoni is a species of beetle in the family Cerambycidae. It was described by Joly in 1991.
