= Eccrisis abdominalis =

Scientific classification
- Domain: Eukaryota
- Kingdom: Animalia
- Phylum: Arthropoda
- Class: Insecta
- Order: Coleoptera
- Suborder: Polyphaga
- Infraorder: Cucujiformia
- Family: Cerambycidae
- Subfamily: Dorcasominae
- Genus: Eccrisis
- Species: E. abdominalis

Binomial name
- Eccrisis abdominalis Pascoe, 1888

Synonyms
- Eccrisis spinicrus (Fairmaire, 1896); Anthribola abdominalis Fairmaire, 1893; Myiodola spinicrus Corinta-Ferreira & Veiga-Ferreira, 1959; Sagridola spinicrus Fairmaire, 1896

Species of beetle

Eccrisis abdominalis is a species in the longhorn beetle family Cerambycidae. It is native to Madagascar.
