= Toxitiades =

Scientific classification
- Kingdom: Animalia
- Phylum: Arthropoda
- Class: Insecta
- Order: Coleoptera
- Suborder: Polyphaga
- Infraorder: Cucujiformia
- Family: Cerambycidae
- Subfamily: Dorcasominae
- Genus: Toxitiades; Fairmaire, 1893

Synonyms
- Toxotiades Fairmaire, 1894

Genus of beetles

Toxitiades is a genus in the longhorn beetle family Cerambycidae. There are about nine described species in Toxitiades, found in Madagascar.

== Species ==
These nine species belong to the genus Toxitiades:

- Toxitiades confusus Villiers, Quentin & Vives, 2011
- Toxitiades corvinus Villiers, Quentin & Vives, 2011
- Toxitiades humeralis Villiers, Quentin & Vives, 2011
- Toxitiades olivaceus (Fairmaire, 1903)
- Toxitiades perrieri (Fairmaire, 1903)
- Toxitiades russus (Fairmaire, 1893)
- Toxitiades sericeus (Guérin-Méneville, 1844)
- Toxitiades subustus (Fairmaire, 1893)
- Toxitiades vinosus (Fairmaire, 1893)
