= Eccrisis =

Scientific classification
- Kingdom: Animalia
- Phylum: Arthropoda
- Class: Insecta
- Order: Coleoptera
- Suborder: Polyphaga
- Infraorder: Cucujiformia
- Family: Cerambycidae
- Subfamily: Dorcasominae
- Genus: Eccrisis; Pascoe, 1888

Synonyms
- Myiodola Fairmaire, 1896

Genus of beetles

Eccrisis is a genus in the longhorn beetle family Cerambycidae. There are about 19 described species in Eccrisis, found in Madagascar. In 2011, Myiodola was made a synonym of Eccrisis, and some of its species were moved here.

== Species ==
These 19 species belong to the genus Eccrisis:

- Eccrisis abdominalis Pascoe, 1888
- Eccrisis adlbaueri Vives, 2003
- Eccrisis alboscutata Villiers, Quentin & Vives, 2011
- Eccrisis biannulata Villiers, Quentin & Vives, 2011
- Eccrisis collaris Villiers, Quentin & Vives, 2011
- Eccrisis dimorpha Villiers, Quentin & Vives, 2011
- Eccrisis discalis Villiers, Quentin & Vives, 2011
- Eccrisis distincta (Fairmaire, 1901)
- Eccrisis filipennis Villiers, Quentin & Vives, 2011
- Eccrisis flavicollis (Waterhouse, 1878)
- Eccrisis luctifera (Fairmaire, 1893)
- Eccrisis muscaria (Fairmaire, 1900)
- Eccrisis perrieri (Fairmaire, 1900)
- Eccrisis plagiaticollis (Fairmaire, 1893)
- Eccrisis ruficornis Villiers, Quentin & Vives, 2011
- Eccrisis scalabrii (Fairmaire, 1896)
- Eccrisis septentrionalis Villiers, Quentin & Vives, 2011
- Eccrisis seyrigi Villiers, Quentin & Vives, 2011
- Eccrisis vitrea Villiers, Quentin & Vives, 2011
