= Trypogeus cabigasi =

Scientific classification
- Domain: Eukaryota
- Kingdom: Animalia
- Phylum: Arthropoda
- Class: Insecta
- Order: Coleoptera
- Suborder: Polyphaga
- Infraorder: Cucujiformia
- Family: Cerambycidae
- Subfamily: Dorcasominae
- Tribe: Dorcasomini
- Genus: Trypogeus
- Species: T. cabigasi

Binomial name
- Trypogeus cabigasi Vives, 2005

Species of beetle

Trypogeus cabigasi is a species in the longhorn beetle family Cerambycidae. It is found in the Philippines.
