= Trypogeus superbus =

Scientific classification
- Kingdom: Animalia
- Phylum: Arthropoda
- Class: Insecta
- Order: Coleoptera
- Suborder: Polyphaga
- Infraorder: Cucujiformia
- Family: Cerambycidae
- Subfamily: Dorcasominae
- Tribe: Dorcasomini
- Genus: Trypogeus
- Species: T. superbus

Binomial name
- Trypogeus superbus (Pic, 1922)

Synonyms
- Toxotus superbus Pic, 1922; Toxotus superbus innotatus Pic, 1927

Species of beetle

Trypogeus superbus is a species in the longhorn beetle family Cerambycidae. It is found in China, Laos, and Vietnam.
