= Trypogeus aureopubens =

Scientific classification
- Kingdom: Animalia
- Phylum: Arthropoda
- Class: Insecta
- Order: Coleoptera
- Suborder: Polyphaga
- Infraorder: Cucujiformia
- Family: Cerambycidae
- Subfamily: Dorcasominae
- Tribe: Dorcasomini
- Genus: Trypogeus
- Species: T. aureopubens

Binomial name
- Trypogeus aureopubens (Pic, 1903)

Synonyms
- Stenocorus aureopubens Aurivillius, 1912; Toxotus aureopubens Pic, 1903

Species of beetle

Trypogeus aureopubens is a species in the longhorn beetle family Cerambycidae. It is found in China and Thailand.
