= Paratoxotus =

Scientific classification
- Kingdom: Animalia
- Phylum: Arthropoda
- Class: Insecta
- Order: Coleoptera
- Suborder: Polyphaga
- Infraorder: Cucujiformia
- Family: Cerambycidae
- Subfamily: Dorcasominae
- Genus: Paratoxotus

Genus of beetles

Paratoxotus is a genus of beetles in the family Cerambycidae, containing the following species:

- Paratoxotus argodi Fairmaire, 1901
- Paratoxotus farinosus Fairmaire, 1902
- Paratoxotus inexpunctatus Fairmaire, 1903
