= Afroartelida quentini =

Scientific classification
- Domain: Eukaryota
- Kingdom: Animalia
- Phylum: Arthropoda
- Class: Insecta
- Order: Coleoptera
- Suborder: Polyphaga
- Infraorder: Cucujiformia
- Family: Cerambycidae
- Genus: Afroartelida
- Species: A. quentini

Binomial name
- Afroartelida quentini Vives, 2011

Species of beetle

Afroartelida quentini is a species of longhorn beetle in the family Cerambycidae found in Malawi. It was described by Vives in 2011.

It is part of the subfamily Dorcasominae and the tribe Apatophysini. It is described as a reddish-brown beetle and is covered by short gray-gold tomentum (hairs), which is particularly dense on the head and protonum of the insect. This tomentum is longer on the legs of the beetle, and shorter on the antennae and elytra. The antennae of the beetle are long and slender, extending far past the end of the elytra. Like most Cerambycids, A.quentini likely feeds on wood, as other species in the family are known tree-killers.
