= Trypogeus coarctatus =

Scientific classification
- Domain: Eukaryota
- Kingdom: Animalia
- Phylum: Arthropoda
- Class: Insecta
- Order: Coleoptera
- Suborder: Polyphaga
- Infraorder: Cucujiformia
- Family: Cerambycidae
- Subfamily: Dorcasominae
- Tribe: Dorcasomini
- Genus: Trypogeus
- Species: T. coarctatus

Binomial name
- Trypogeus coarctatus Holzschuh, 2006

Species of beetle

Trypogeus coarctatus is a species in the longhorn beetle family Cerambycidae. It is found in Indonesia.
