= Toxitiades perrieri =

Scientific classification
- Kingdom: Animalia
- Phylum: Arthropoda
- Clade: Pancrustacea
- Class: Insecta
- Order: Coleoptera
- Suborder: Polyphaga
- Infraorder: Cucujiformia
- Family: Cerambycidae
- Subfamily: Dorcasominae
- Genus: Toxitiades
- Species: T. perrieri

Binomial name
- Toxitiades perrieri (Fairmaire, 1903)

Synonyms
- Artelida perrieri Corinta-Ferreira & Veiga-Ferreira, 1959

Species of beetle

Toxitiades perrieri is a species in the longhorn beetle family Cerambycidae. It is found in Madagascar.
