= Toxitiades olivaceus =

Scientific classification
- Kingdom: Animalia
- Phylum: Arthropoda
- Clade: Pancrustacea
- Class: Insecta
- Order: Coleoptera
- Suborder: Polyphaga
- Infraorder: Cucujiformia
- Family: Cerambycidae
- Subfamily: Dorcasominae
- Genus: Toxitiades
- Species: T. olivaceus

Binomial name
- Toxitiades olivaceus (Fairmaire, 1903)

Synonyms
- Artelida olivacea Aurivillius, 1912; Toxitiades olivacea Boppe, 1921

Species of beetle

Toxitiades olivaceus is a species in the longhorn beetle family Cerambycidae. It is found in Madagascar.
