= Eccrisis muscaria =

Scientific classification
- Kingdom: Animalia
- Phylum: Arthropoda
- Class: Insecta
- Order: Coleoptera
- Suborder: Polyphaga
- Infraorder: Cucujiformia
- Family: Cerambycidae
- Genus: Eccrisis
- Species: E. muscaria

Binomial name
- Eccrisis muscaria (Fairmaire, 1900)

Species of beetle

Eccrisis muscaria is a species of beetle in the family Cerambycidae. It was described by Fairmaire in 1900.
