= Paratoxotus argodi =

Scientific classification
- Kingdom: Animalia
- Phylum: Arthropoda
- Clade: Pancrustacea
- Class: Insecta
- Order: Coleoptera
- Suborder: Polyphaga
- Infraorder: Cucujiformia
- Family: Cerambycidae
- Genus: Paratoxotus
- Species: P. argodi

Binomial name
- Paratoxotus argodi Fairmaire, 1901

Species of beetle in the family Cerambycidae

Paratoxotus argodi is a species of beetle in the family Cerambycidae. It was described by Fairmaire in 1901.
