= Borneophysis =

Scientific classification
- Domain: Eukaryota
- Kingdom: Animalia
- Phylum: Arthropoda
- Class: Insecta
- Order: Coleoptera
- Suborder: Polyphaga
- Infraorder: Cucujiformia
- Family: Cerambycidae
- Tribe: Dorcasomini
- Genus: Borneophysis; Vives & Heffern, 2006
- Species: B. chewi

Binomial name
- Borneophysis chewi Vives & Heffern, 2006

Genus of beetles

Borneophysis is a genus in the longhorn beetle family Cerambycidae. This genus has a single species, Borneophysis chewi. It is found in Indonesia and Malaysia.
