= Eccrisis luctifera =

Scientific classification
- Kingdom: Animalia
- Phylum: Arthropoda
- Clade: Pancrustacea
- Class: Insecta
- Order: Coleoptera
- Suborder: Polyphaga
- Infraorder: Cucujiformia
- Family: Cerambycidae
- Genus: Eccrisis
- Species: E. luctifera

Binomial name
- Eccrisis luctifera (Fairmaire, 1893)

Synonyms
- Anthribola niviguttata Corinta-Ferreira & Veiga-Ferreira, 1959; Sagridola luctifera Boppe, 1921

Species of beetle

Eccrisis luctifera is a species of long-horned beetle in the beetle family Cerambycidae. It is found in Madagascar.
