= Eccrisis distincta =

Scientific classification
- Kingdom: Animalia
- Phylum: Arthropoda
- Class: Insecta
- Order: Coleoptera
- Suborder: Polyphaga
- Infraorder: Cucujiformia
- Family: Cerambycidae
- Genus: Eccrisis
- Species: E. distincta

Binomial name
- Eccrisis distincta (Fairmaire, 1901)

Synonyms
- Myiodola distincta Fairmaire, 1901

Species of beetle

Eccrisis distincta is a species of beetle in the family Cerambycidae. It was described by Fairmaire in 1901.
