= Paratoxotus inexpunctatus =

Scientific classification
- Kingdom: Animalia
- Phylum: Arthropoda
- Class: Insecta
- Order: Coleoptera
- Suborder: Polyphaga
- Infraorder: Cucujiformia
- Family: Cerambycidae
- Genus: Paratoxotus
- Species: P. inexpunctatus

Binomial name
- Paratoxotus inexpunctatus Fairmaire, 1903

Species of beetle

Paratoxotus inexpunctatus is a species of beetle in the family Cerambycidae. It was described by Fairmaire in 1903.
