= Capetoxotus =

Scientific classification
- Domain: Eukaryota
- Kingdom: Animalia
- Phylum: Arthropoda
- Class: Insecta
- Order: Coleoptera
- Suborder: Polyphaga
- Infraorder: Cucujiformia
- Family: Cerambycidae
- Subfamily: Dorcasominae
- Genus: Capetoxotus; Tippmann, 1959
- Species: C. rugosus

Binomial name
- Capetoxotus rugosus Tippmann, 1959

Genus of beetles

Capetoxotus is a genus in the longhorn beetle family Cerambycidae. This genus has a single species, Capetoxotus rugosus. It is found in South Africa.
