= Kudekanye =

Scientific classification
- Kingdom: Animalia
- Phylum: Arthropoda
- Clade: Pancrustacea
- Class: Insecta
- Order: Coleoptera
- Suborder: Polyphaga
- Infraorder: Cucujiformia
- Family: Cerambycidae
- Tribe: Dorcasomini
- Genus: Kudekanye; Rice, 2008
- Species: K. suidafrika

Binomial name
- Kudekanye suidafrika Rice, 2008

Genus of beetles

Kudekanye is a genus in the longhorn beetle family Cerambycidae. This genus has a single species, Kudekanye suidafrika, found in South Africa.
