= Dorcasomus delegorguei =

Scientific classification
- Kingdom: Animalia
- Phylum: Arthropoda
- Class: Insecta
- Order: Coleoptera
- Suborder: Polyphaga
- Infraorder: Cucujiformia
- Family: Cerambycidae
- Genus: Dorcasomus
- Species: D. delegorguei

Binomial name
- Dorcasomus delegorguei Guérin-Méneville, 1845

Species of beetle

Dorcasomus delegorguei is a species of beetle in the family Cerambycidae. It was described by Félix Édouard Guérin-Méneville in 1845.
