= Micrometopus =

Scientific classification
- Domain: Eukaryota
- Kingdom: Animalia
- Phylum: Arthropoda
- Class: Insecta
- Order: Coleoptera
- Suborder: Polyphaga
- Infraorder: Cucujiformia
- Family: Cerambycidae
- Tribe: Dorcasomini
- Genus: Micrometopus; Quedenfeldt, 1885
- Species: M. punctipennis

Binomial name
- Micrometopus punctipennis Quedenfeldt, 1885

Genus of beetles

Micrometopus is a genus in the longhorn beetle family Cerambycidae. This genus has a single species, Micrometopus punctipennis, found in Angola.
