= Lycosomus =

Scientific classification
- Domain: Eukaryota
- Kingdom: Animalia
- Phylum: Arthropoda
- Class: Insecta
- Order: Coleoptera
- Suborder: Polyphaga
- Infraorder: Cucujiformia
- Family: Cerambycidae
- Tribe: Dorcasomini
- Genus: Lycosomus; Aurivillius, 1903
- Species: L. mirabilis

Binomial name
- Lycosomus mirabilis Aurivillius, 1903

Genus of beetles

Lycosomus is a genus in the longhorn beetle family Cerambycidae. This genus has a single species, Lycosomus mirabilis, found in Cameroon and Madagascar.

This species was described by Per Olof Christopher Aurivillius in 1903.
