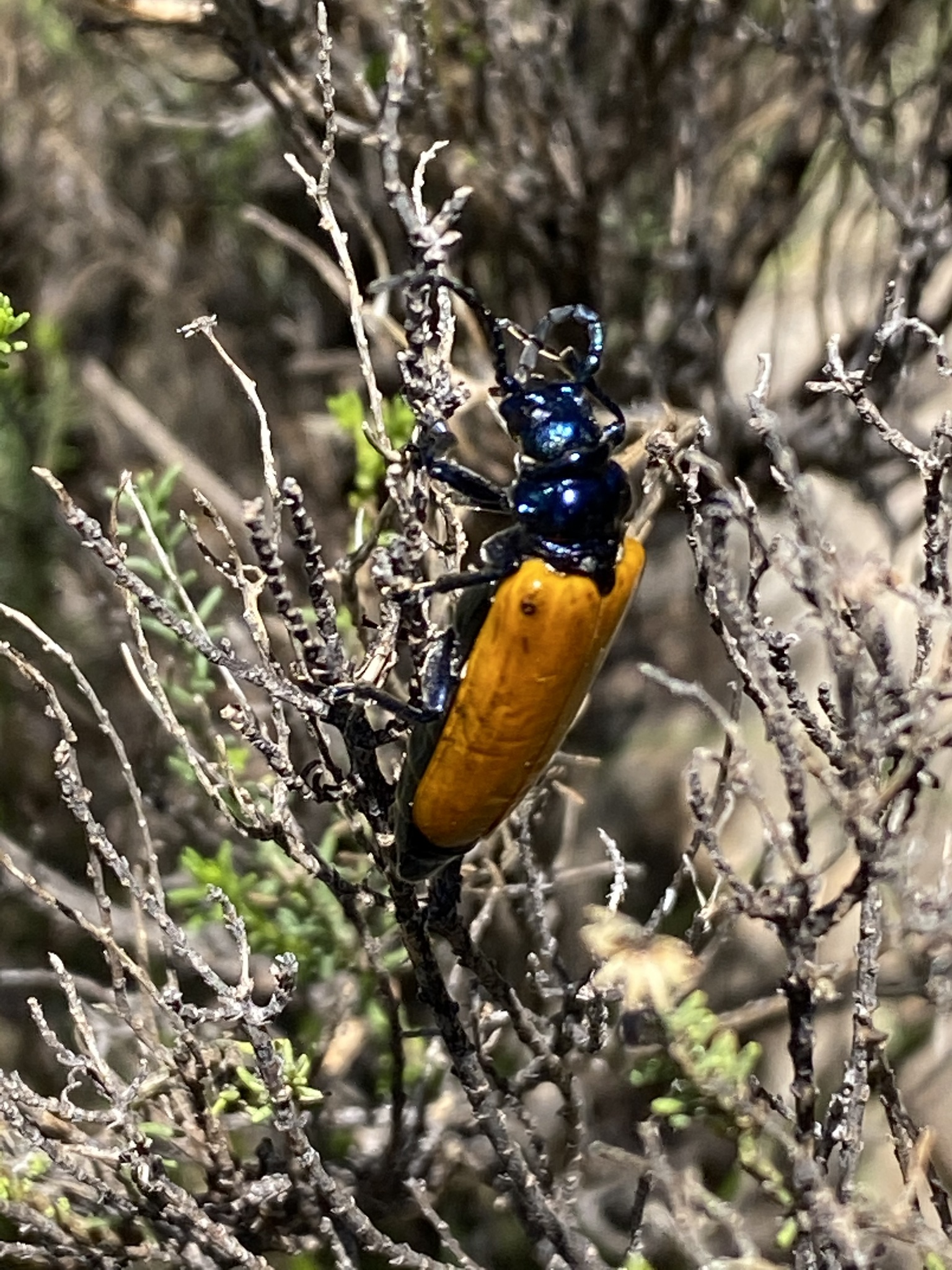
- Dorcasomus ebulinus, South Africa

Scientific classification
- Kingdom: Animalia
- Phylum: Arthropoda
- Class: Insecta
- Order: Coleoptera
- Suborder: Polyphaga
- Infraorder: Cucujiformia
- Family: Cerambycidae
- Subfamily: Dorcasominae
- Tribe: Dorcasomini
- Genus: Dorcasomus; Audinet-Serville, 1834

Synonyms
- Dorcadosomus Agassiz, 1846

= Dorcasomus =

Genus of beetles

Dorcasomus is a genus in the longhorn beetle family Cerambycidae. There are about nine described species in Dorcasomus, found in Africa.

== Species ==
These nine species belong to the genus Dorcasomus:

- Dorcasomus batesi Quentin & Villiers, 1970 (South Africa)
- Dorcasomus capensis Quentin & Villiers, 1970 (South Africa)
- Dorcasomus delegorguei Guérin-Méneville, 1845 (South Africa)
- Dorcasomus ebulinus (Fabricius, 1787) (South Africa)
- Dorcasomus evani Le Gall & Juhel, 2017 (Cameroon)
- Dorcasomus gigas Aurivillius, 1914 (Kenya, DR Congo, Rwanda, and Uganda)
- Dorcasomus mirabilis Quentin & Villiers, 1970 (DR Congo)
- Dorcasomus pinheyi Quentin & Villiers, 1970 (Malawi, Zimbabwe)
- Dorcasomus urundiensis Quentin & Villiers, 1970 (Burundi)
