= Dorcasomus pinheyi =

Scientific classification
- Kingdom: Animalia
- Phylum: Arthropoda
- Class: Insecta
- Order: Coleoptera
- Suborder: Polyphaga
- Infraorder: Cucujiformia
- Family: Cerambycidae
- Genus: Dorcasomus
- Species: D. pinheyi

Binomial name
- Dorcasomus pinheyi Quentin & Villiers, 1970

Species of beetle

Dorcasomus pinheyi is a species of beetle in the family Cerambycidae. It was described by Quentin and Villiers in 1970.
