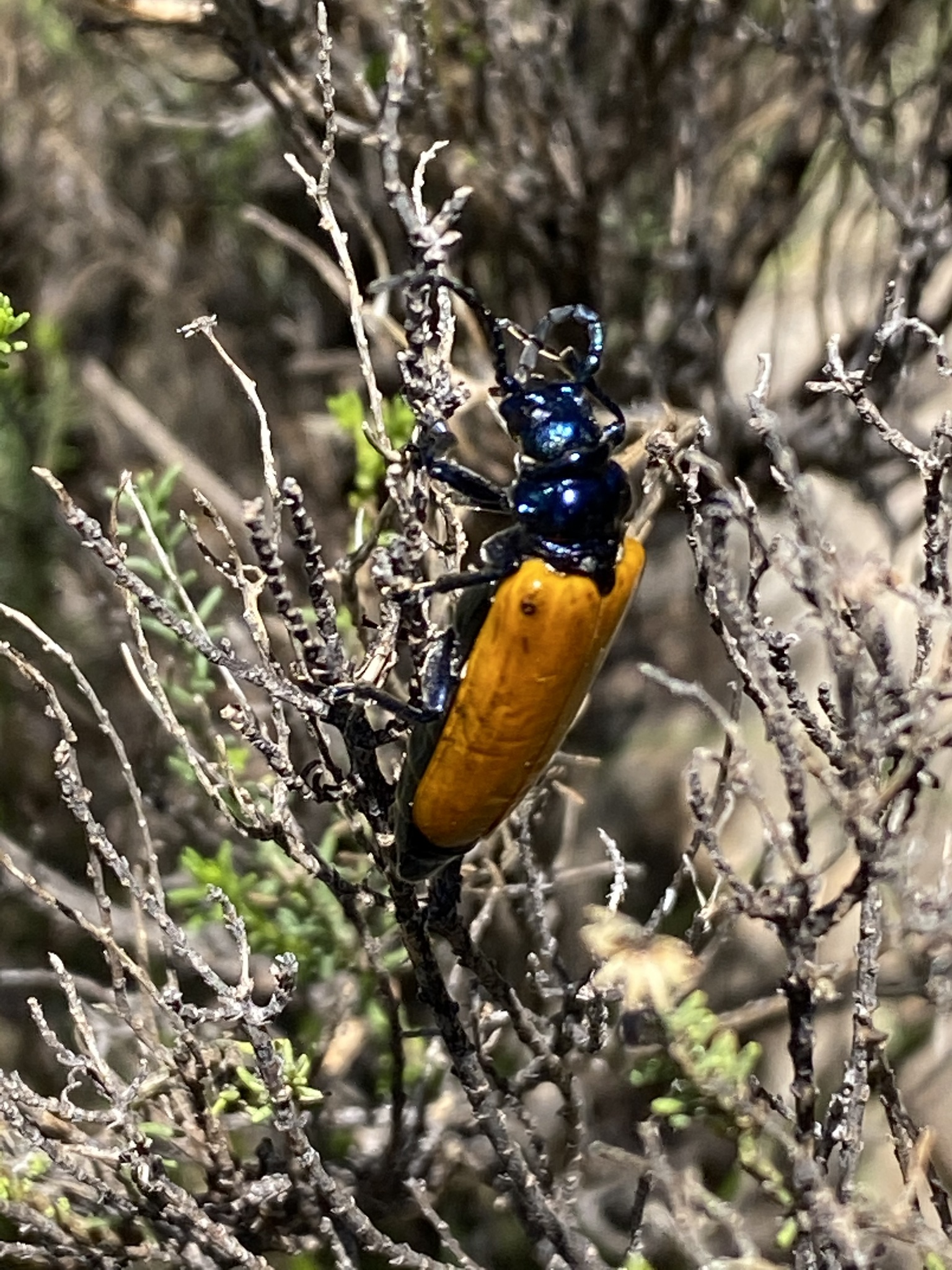
- Dorcasomus ebulinus, South Africa

Scientific classification
- Kingdom: Animalia
- Phylum: Arthropoda
- Class: Insecta
- Order: Coleoptera
- Suborder: Polyphaga
- Infraorder: Cucujiformia
- Family: Cerambycidae
- Genus: Dorcasomus
- Species: D. ebulinus

Binomial name
- Dorcasomus ebulinus (Fabricius, 1787)

Synonyms
- Cerambyx cafer Gmelin, 1790; Cerambyx ebulinus Fabricius, 1801; Ceramryx ebulinus Fabricius, 1787; Stenocorus testaceus Olivier, 1795

= Dorcasomus ebulinus =

Species of beetle

Dorcasomus ebulinus is a species of beetle in the family Cerambycidae. It is found in South Africa.

This species was described by Johan Christian Fabricius in 1787.
