= Trypogeus =

Scientific classification
- Domain: Eukaryota
- Kingdom: Animalia
- Phylum: Arthropoda
- Class: Insecta
- Order: Coleoptera
- Suborder: Polyphaga
- Infraorder: Cucujiformia
- Family: Cerambycidae
- Subfamily: Dorcasominae
- Tribe: Dorcasomini
- Genus: Trypogeus; Lacordaire, 1869

Genus of beetles

Trypogeus is a genus of Long-Horned Beetles in the beetle family Cerambycidae. There are about 14 described species in Trypogeus, found in China and Southeast Asia.

== Species ==
These 14 species belong to the genus Trypogeus:

- Trypogeus albicornis Lacordaire, 1869 (Indonesia and Malaysia)
- Trypogeus aureopubens (Pic, 1903) (China and Thailand)
- Trypogeus barclayi Vives, 2007 (Brunei, Indonesia, and Malaysia)
- Trypogeus cabigasi Vives, 2005 (Philippines)
- Trypogeus coarctatus Holzschuh, 2006 (Indonesia)
- Trypogeus gressitti Miroshnikov, 2014 (Laos)
- Trypogeus guangxiensis Miroshnikov & Liu, 2016 (China)
- Trypogeus javanicus Aurivillius, 1925 (Indonesia)
- Trypogeus murzini Miroshnikov, 2014 (Cambodia)
- Trypogeus pygmaeus Miroshnikov, 2018 (Vietnam)
- Trypogeus sericeus (Gressitt, 1951) (China)
- Trypogeus superbus (Pic, 1922) (China, Laos, and Vietnam)
- Trypogeus taynguyensis Miroshnikov, 2018 (Vietnam)
- Trypogeus tonkinensis Miroshnikov, 2018 (Vietnam)
