= Pachyticon =

Scientific classification
- Domain: Eukaryota
- Kingdom: Animalia
- Phylum: Arthropoda
- Class: Insecta
- Order: Coleoptera
- Suborder: Polyphaga
- Infraorder: Cucujiformia
- Family: Cerambycidae
- Tribe: Dorcasomini
- Genus: Pachyticon; Thomson, 1857
- Species: P. brunneum

Binomial name
- Pachyticon brunneum Thomson, 1857

Genus of beetles

Pachyticon is a genus in the longhorn beetle family Cerambycidae. This genus has a single species, Pachyticon brunneum, found in South Africa.
