= Microcapnolymma =

Scientific classification
- Kingdom: Animalia
- Phylum: Arthropoda
- Class: Insecta
- Order: Coleoptera
- Suborder: Polyphaga
- Infraorder: Cucujiformia
- Family: Cerambycidae
- Tribe: Dorcasomini
- Genus: Microcapnolymma; Pic, 1928
- Species: M. angustata

Binomial name
- Microcapnolymma angustata Pic, 1928

Genus of beetles

Microcapnolymma is a genus in the longhorn beetle family Cerambycidae. This genus has a single species, Microcapnolymma angustata, found in Vietnam.
