= Eccrisis scalabrii =

Scientific classification
- Kingdom: Animalia
- Phylum: Arthropoda
- Class: Insecta
- Order: Coleoptera
- Suborder: Polyphaga
- Infraorder: Cucujiformia
- Family: Cerambycidae
- Genus: Eccrisis
- Species: E. scalabrii

Binomial name
- Eccrisis scalabrii (Fairmaire, 1896)

Synonyms
- Myiodola scalabrii (Fairmaire, 1896)

Species of beetle

Eccrisis scalabrii is a species of beetle in the family Cerambycidae. It was described by Fairmaire in 1896.
