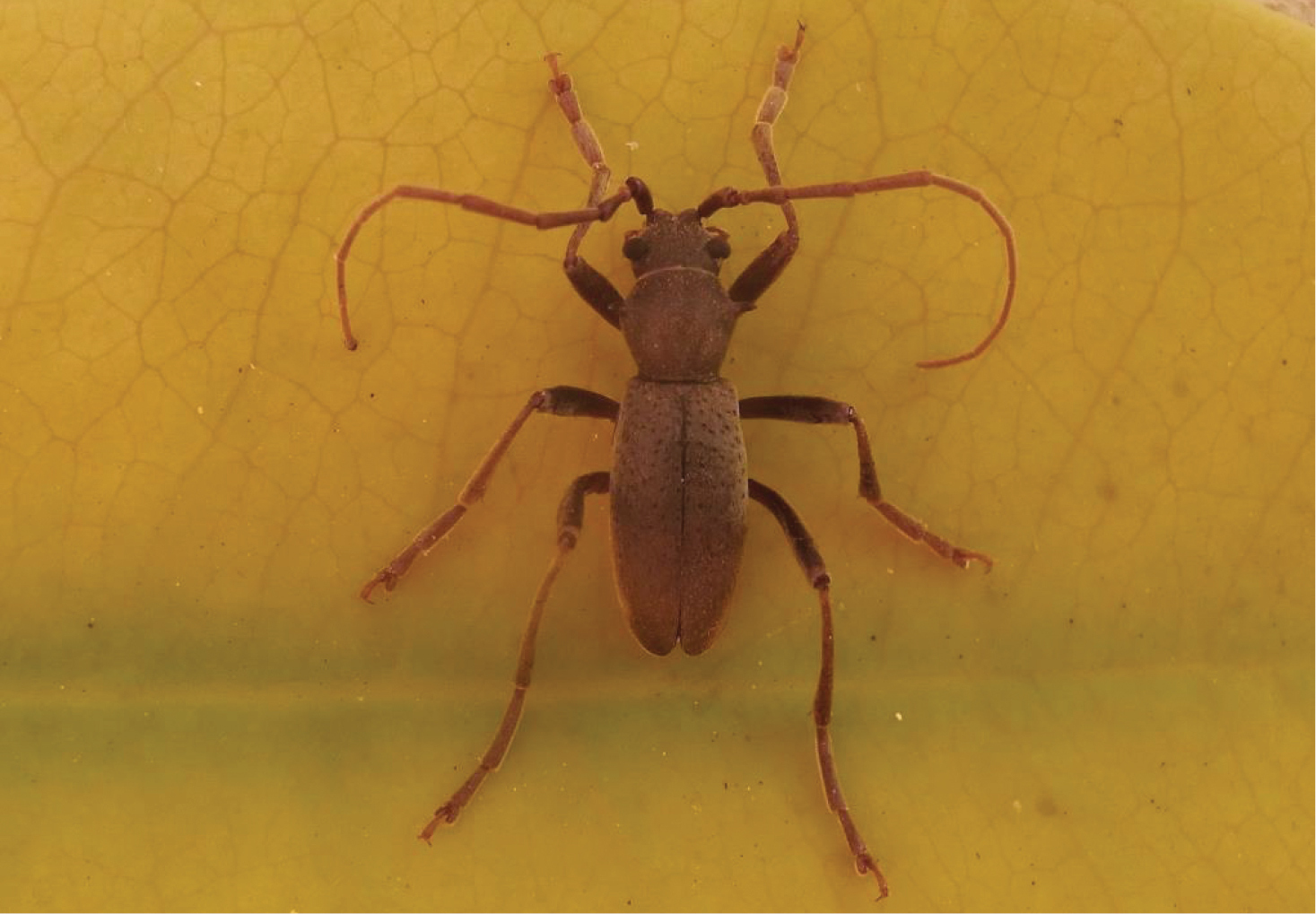
- Male Apterotoxitiades vivesi

Scientific classification
- Domain: Eukaryota
- Kingdom: Animalia
- Phylum: Arthropoda
- Class: Insecta
- Order: Coleoptera
- Suborder: Polyphaga
- Infraorder: Cucujiformia
- Family: Cerambycidae
- Subfamily: Dorcasominae
- Genus: Apterotoxitiades; Adlbauer, 2008

= Apterotoxitiades =

Genus of beetles

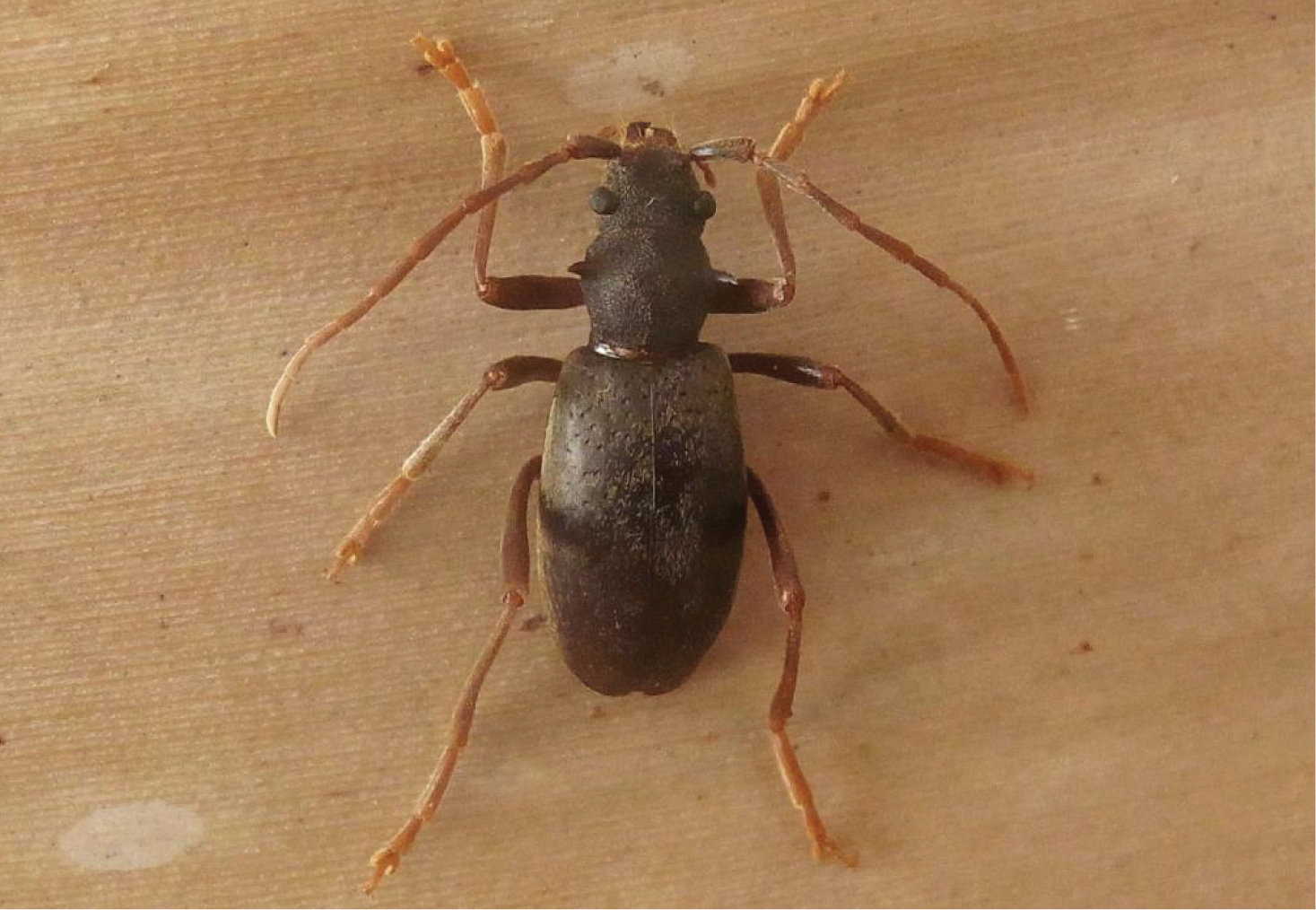
Apterotoxitiades vivesi

Apterotoxitiades is a genus in the longhorn beetle family Cerambycidae. There are at least two described species in Apterotoxitiades, found in South Africa.

== Species ==
These two species belong to the genus Apterotoxitiades:

- Apterotoxitiades aspinosus Adlbauer, Bjørnstad & Perissinotto, 2015
- Apterotoxitiades vivesi Adlbauer, 2008
