= Eccrisis flavicollis =

Scientific classification
- Domain: Eukaryota
- Kingdom: Animalia
- Phylum: Arthropoda
- Class: Insecta
- Order: Coleoptera
- Suborder: Polyphaga
- Infraorder: Cucujiformia
- Family: Cerambycidae
- Genus: Eccrisis
- Species: E. flavicollis

Binomial name
- Eccrisis flavicollis (Waterhouse, 1878)

Species of beetle

Eccrisis flavicollis is a species of beetle in the family Cerambycidae. It was described by Waterhouse in 1878.
