= Eccrisis plagiaticollis =

Scientific classification
- Kingdom: Animalia
- Phylum: Arthropoda
- Class: Insecta
- Order: Coleoptera
- Suborder: Polyphaga
- Infraorder: Cucujiformia
- Family: Cerambycidae
- Genus: Eccrisis
- Species: E. plagiaticollis

Binomial name
- Eccrisis plagiaticollis (Fairmaire, 1893)

Synonyms
- Myiodola plagiaticollis (Fairmaire, 1893)

Species of beetle

Eccrisis plagiaticollis is a species of beetle in the family Cerambycidae. It was described by Fairmaire in 1893.
