= Eccrisis adlbaueri =

Scientific classification
- Domain: Eukaryota
- Kingdom: Animalia
- Phylum: Arthropoda
- Class: Insecta
- Order: Coleoptera
- Suborder: Polyphaga
- Infraorder: Cucujiformia
- Family: Cerambycidae
- Genus: Eccrisis
- Species: E. adlbaueri

Binomial name
- Eccrisis adlbaueri Vives, 2003

Species of beetle

Eccrisis adlbaueri is a species of beetle in the family Cerambycidae. It was described by Vives in 2003.
