= Eccrisis perrieri =

Scientific classification
- Kingdom: Animalia
- Phylum: Arthropoda
- Class: Insecta
- Order: Coleoptera
- Suborder: Polyphaga
- Infraorder: Cucujiformia
- Family: Cerambycidae
- Genus: Eccrisis
- Species: E. perrieri

Binomial name
- Eccrisis perrieri (Fairmaire, 1900)

Synonyms
- Myiodola perrieri Fairmaire, 1900

Species of beetle

Eccrisis perrieri is a species of beetle in the family Cerambycidae. It was described by Fairmaire in 1900.
