= Afrocrisis =

Scientific classification
- Domain: Eukaryota
- Kingdom: Animalia
- Phylum: Arthropoda
- Class: Insecta
- Order: Coleoptera
- Suborder: Polyphaga
- Infraorder: Cucujiformia
- Family: Cerambycidae
- Tribe: Dorcasomini
- Genus: Afrocrisis; Vives, 2009
- Species: A. perissonottoi

Binomial name
- Afrocrisis perissonottoi Vives, 2009

Synonyms
- Afroccrisis Vives, 2009

Genus of beetles

Afrocrisis is a genus in the longhorn beetle family Cerambycidae. This genus has a single species, Afrocrisis perissonottoi, found in South Africa.
