= Afroartelida teunisseni =

Scientific classification
- Domain: Eukaryota
- Kingdom: Animalia
- Phylum: Arthropoda
- Class: Insecta
- Order: Coleoptera
- Suborder: Polyphaga
- Infraorder: Cucujiformia
- Family: Cerambycidae
- Genus: Afroartelida
- Species: A. teunisseni

Binomial name
- Afroartelida teunisseni Vives & Adlbauer, 2005

Species of beetle

Afroartelida teunisseni is a species of beetle in the family Cerambycidae. It was described by Vives and Adlbauer in 2005.
