= Toxitiades sericeus =

Scientific classification
- Kingdom: Animalia
- Phylum: Arthropoda
- Clade: Pancrustacea
- Class: Insecta
- Order: Coleoptera
- Suborder: Polyphaga
- Infraorder: Cucujiformia
- Family: Cerambycidae
- Genus: Toxitiades
- Species: T. sericeus

Binomial name
- Toxitiades sericeus (Guérin-Méneville, 1844)

Species of beetle

Toxitiades sericeus is a species of beetle in the family Cerambycidae. It was described by Félix Édouard Guérin-Méneville in 1844.
