= Otteissa =

Scientific classification
- Kingdom: Animalia
- Phylum: Arthropoda
- Class: Insecta
- Order: Coleoptera
- Suborder: Polyphaga
- Infraorder: Cucujiformia
- Family: Cerambycidae
- Genus: Otteissa
- Species: O. sericea

Binomial name
- Otteissa sericea Pascoe, 1864

Genus of beetles

Otteissa sericea is a species of beetle in the family Cerambycidae, and the only species in the genus Otteissa. It was described by Pascoe in 1864. It can be found in South Africa.

== Description ==
Male Otteissa sericea are reddish-brown with a square globose pronotum, elongated legs thickened tarsal joints, cup-shaped onychium with two anterior lateral teeth, and strongly curved claws. Their antennae are long, extending slightly beyond the elytral apex. Females have a more pronounced reddish coloration, dark brown mandibles, and non-enlarged tarsal joints with a long, slender onychium. Females have shorter antennae reaching the apical quarter.
