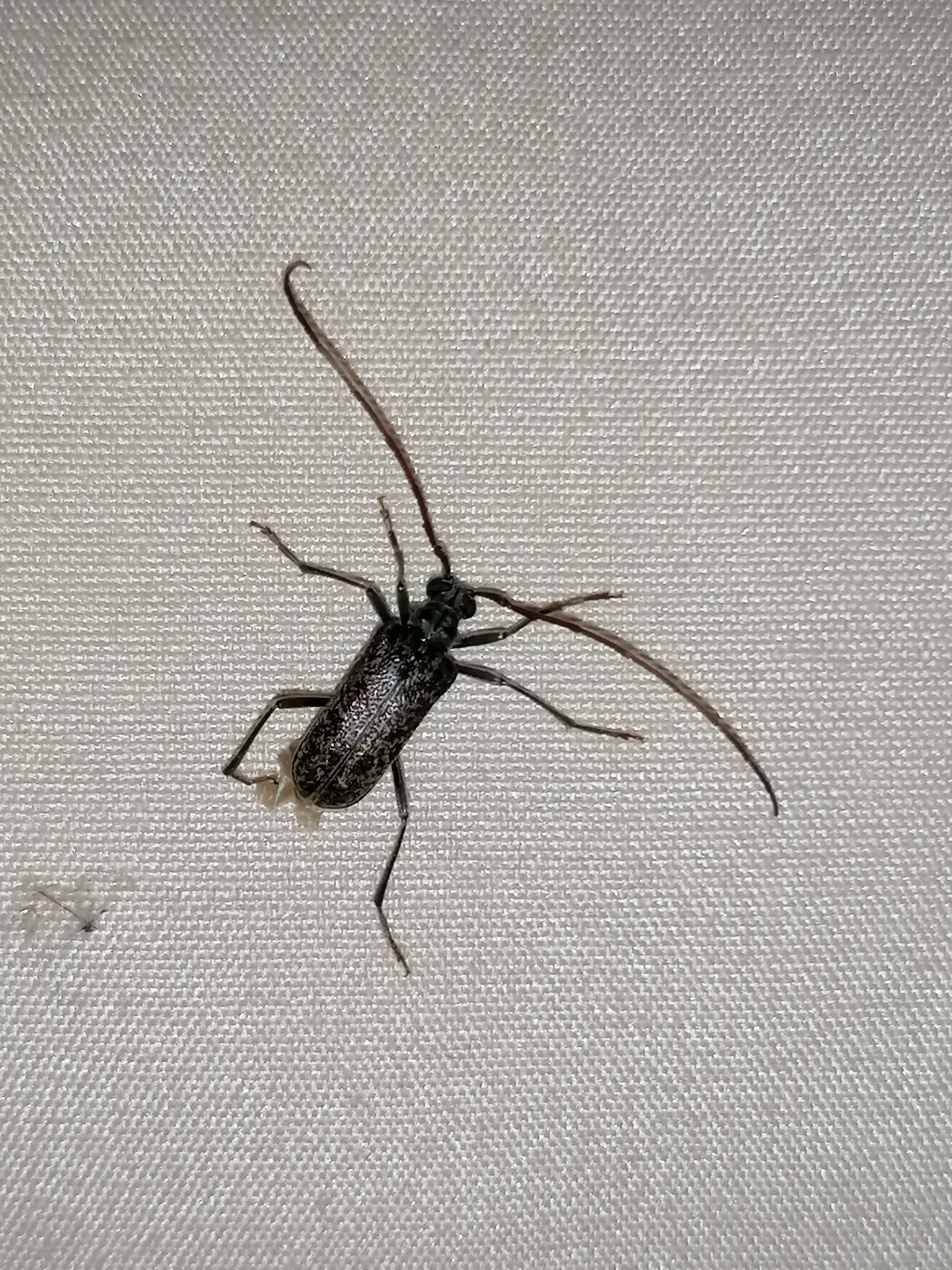
- Afroartelida teunisseni, South Africa

Scientific classification
- Domain: Eukaryota
- Kingdom: Animalia
- Phylum: Arthropoda
- Class: Insecta
- Order: Coleoptera
- Suborder: Polyphaga
- Infraorder: Cucujiformia
- Family: Cerambycidae
- Subfamily: Apatophyseinae
- Tribe: Apatophyseini
- Genus: Afroartelida; Vives & Adlbauer, 2005

= Afroartelida =

Genus of beetles

Afroartelida is a genus in the longhorn beetle family Cerambycidae. There are at least three described species in Afroartelida, found in Africa.

== Species ==
These three species belong to the genus Afroartelida:

- Afroartelida quentini Vives, 2011 (Malawi)
- Afroartelida somaliensis Adlbauer, 2014 (Somalia)
- Afroartelida teunisseni Vives & Adlbauer, 2005 (South Africa, Eswatini, and Zimbabwe)
