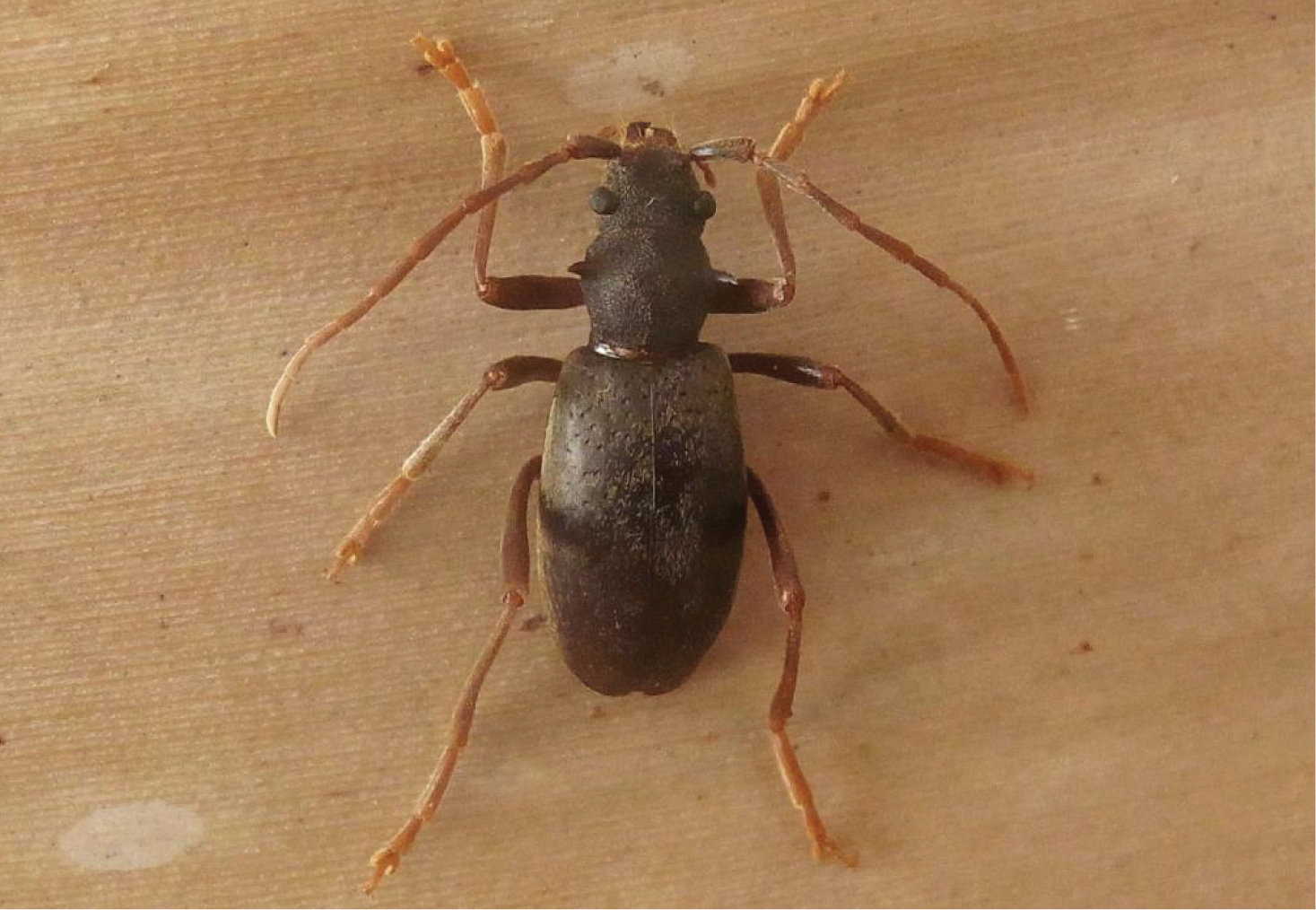
- Apterotoxitiades vivesi, South Africa

Scientific classification
- Kingdom: Animalia
- Phylum: Arthropoda
- Class: Insecta
- Order: Coleoptera
- Suborder: Polyphaga
- Infraorder: Cucujiformia
- Family: Cerambycidae
- Subfamily: Dorcasominae; Lacordaire 1868

= Dorcasominae =

Subfamily of beetles

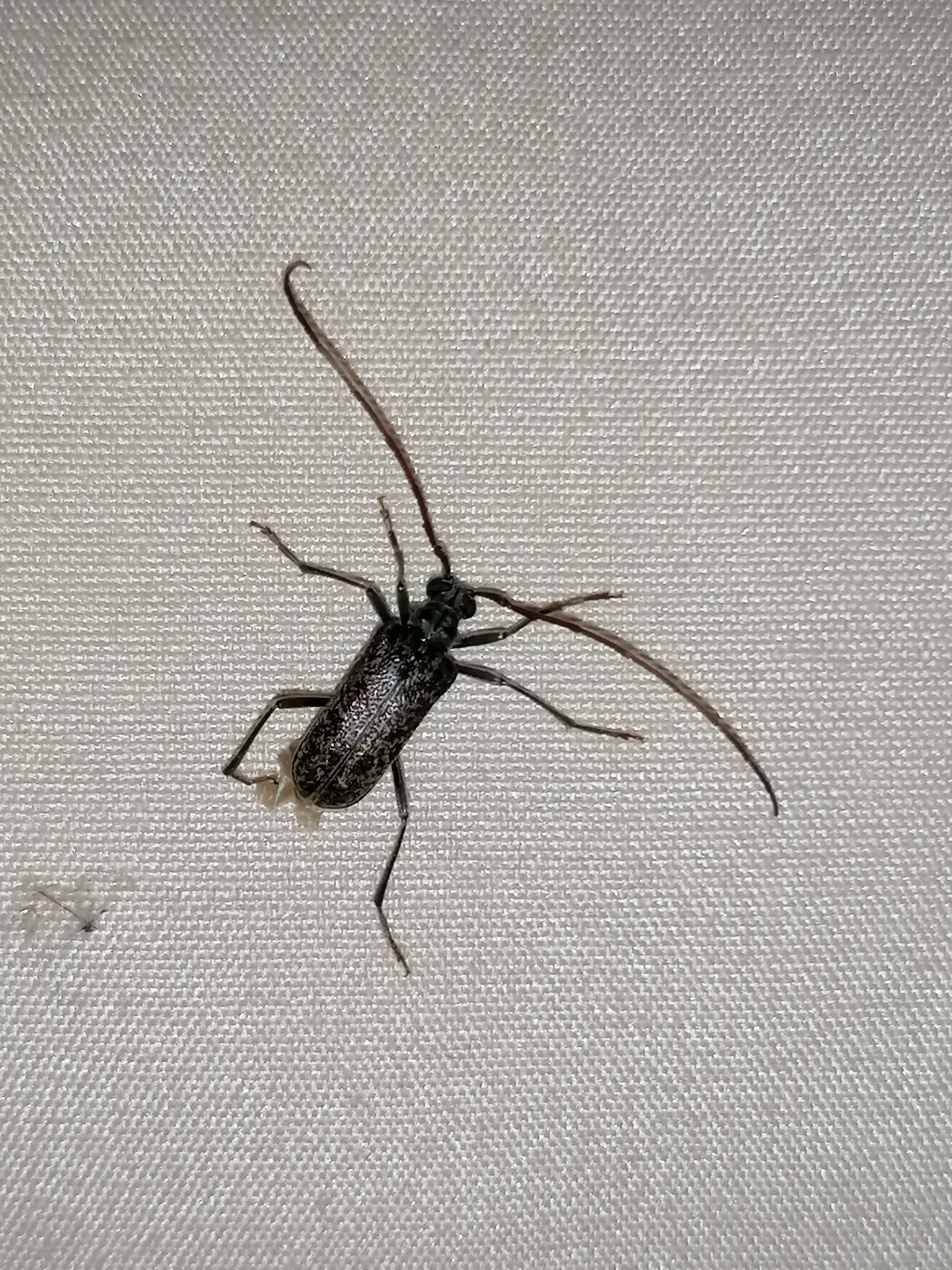
Afroartelida teunisseni, South Africa

Dorcasominae is a subfamily in the longhorn beetle family Cerambycidae. There are about 14 genera and more than 30 described species in Dorcasominae, found mainly in Asia and Africa. These genera are sometimes considered members of the tribe Dorcasomini, which would be the only tribe of this subfamily. This classification is in accordance with the TITAN Cerambycidae database, Catalogue of Life, and Photographic Catalog of the Cerambycidae of the Old World. It is similar to that of Bouchard et al. in "Family-group names in Coleoptera", 2011.

In addition to the 14 genera currently in Dorcasominae, this subfamily formerly contained more than 100 genera in following tribes:

- Apatophyseini (now in subfamily Apatophyseinae with 98 genera)
- Protaxini (now in subfamily Cerambycinae)
- Trigonarthrini (now in subfamily Cerambycinae)
- Trypogeini (now genus Trypogeus of this subfamily)

== Genera ==
These 14 genera belong to the subfamily Dorcasominae:

- Afroartelida Vives & Adlbauer, 2005
- Afrocrisis Vives, 2009
- Apterotoxitiadella Bjørnstad, 2017
- Apterotoxitiades Adlbauer, 2008
- Borneophysis Vives & Heffern, 2006
- Capetoxotus Tippmann, 1959
- Dorcasomus Audinet-Serville, 1834
- Kudekanye Rice, 2008
- Lycosomus Aurivillius, 1903
- Microcapnolymma Pic, 1928
- Micrometopus Quedenfeldt, 1885
- Otteissa Pascoe, 1864
- Pachyticon Thomson, 1857
- Trypogeus Lacordaire, 1869
