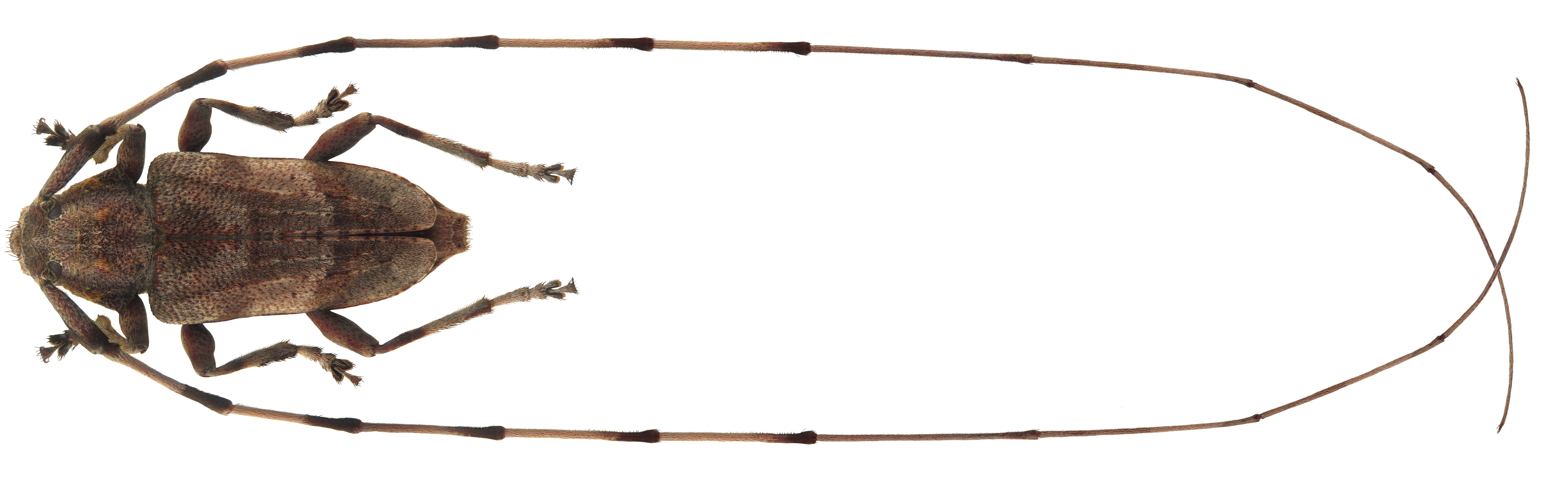
- Acanthocinus aedilis

Scientific classification
- Kingdom: Animalia
- Phylum: Arthropoda
- Clade: Pancrustacea
- Class: Insecta
- Order: Coleoptera
- Suborder: Polyphaga
- Infraorder: Cucujiformia
- Family: Cerambycidae
- Subfamily: Lamiinae
- Tribe: Acanthocinini; Blanchard, 1845

= Acanthocinini =

Tribe of beetles

Acanthocinini is a tribe of longhorn beetles of the subfamily Lamiinae. It was described by Émile Blanchard in 1845.

== Taxonomy ==
- Acanista Pascoe, 1864
- Acanthocinus Megerle in Dejean, 1821
- Acanthodoxus Martins & Monné, 1974
- Acartus Fahraeus, 1872
- Aegocidnexocentrus Breuning, 1957
- Alcathousiella Monné, 2005
- Alcathousites Gilmour, 1962
- Alcidion Sturm, 1843
- Alloeomorphus Monné & Monné, 2011
- Alphinellus Bates, 1881
- Ameipsis Pascoe, 1865
- Amniscites Gilmour, 1957
- Amniscus Dejean, 1835
- Ancylistes Chevrolat, 1863
- Anisolophia Melzer, 1934
- Anisopodesthes Melzer, 1931
- Anisopodus White, 1855
- Antecrurisa Gilmour, 1960
- Antennexocentrus Breuning, 1957
- Antilleptostylus Gilmour, 1963
- Aphronastes Fairmaire, 1896
- Apteralcidion Hovore, 1992
- Apteroleiopus Breuning, 1955
- Astyleiopus Dillon, 1956
- Astylidius Casey, 1913
- Astylopsis Casey, 1913
- Atelographus Melzer, 1927
- Atrypanius Bates, 1864
- Australiorondonia Breuning, 1982
- Australoleiopus Breuning, 1970
- Baecacanthus Monné, 1975
- Baryssiniella Berkov & Monne, 2010
- Baryssinus Bates, 1864
- Beloesthes Thomson, 1864
- Boninella Gressitt, 1956
- Boninoleiops Hasegawa & Makihara, 2001
- Bourbonia Jordan, 1894
- Brevoxathres Gilmour, 1959
- Bulbolmotega Breuning, 1966
- Callipero Bates, 1864
- Calolamia Tippmann, 1953
- Canidia Thomson, 1857
- Carinoclodia Breuning, 1959
- Carpheolus Bates, 1885
- Carphina Bates, 1872
- Carphontes Bates, 1881
- Catharesthes Bates, 1881
- Chaetacosta Gilmour, 1961
- Chydaeopsis Pascoe, 1864
- Clavemeopedus Breuning, 1969
- Cleodoxus homson, 1864
- Clodia Pascoe, 1864
- Cobelura Erichson, 1847
- Coenopoeus Horn, 1880
- Colobeutrypanus Tippmann, 1953
- Cometochus Villiers, 1980
- Contoderopsis Breuning, 1956
- Contoderus Thomson, 1864
- Cosmotoma Blanchard, 1845
- Cristenes Breuning, 1978
- Cristisse Breuning, 1955
- Cristocentrus Breuning, 1957
- Cristurges Gilmour, 1961
- Dectes LeConte, 1852
- Didymocentrotus McKeown, 1945
- Dolichoplomelas Breuning, 1958
- Driopea Pascoe, 1858
- Dryana Gistel & Bromme, 1848
- Eleothinus Bates, 1881
- Elongatocontoderus Breuning, 1977
- Emeopedopsis Breuning, 1965
- Emeopedus Pascoe, 1864
- Eneodes Fisher, 1926
- Enes Pascoe, 1864
- Eoporis Pascoe, 1864
- Erphaea Erichson, 1847
- Eucharitolus Bates, 1885
- Eugamandus Fisher, 1926
- Euryclytosemia Hayashi, 1963
- Euryxaenapta Breuning, 1963
- Eutrichillus Bates, 1885
- Eutrypanus Erichson, 1847
- Exalcidion Monné, 1977
- Exocentroides Breuning, 1958
- Exocentrus Dejean, 1835
- Falsacanthocinus Breuning, 1951
- Falsexocentrus Breuning, 1970
- Falsometopides Breuning, 1957
- Falsovelleda Breuning, 1954
- Fasciculancylistes Breuning, 1965
- Fisherostylus Gilmour, 1963
- Freoexocentrus Breuning, 1977
- Georgeana Monne & Monne, 2011
- Glaucotes Casey, 1913
- Goephanes Pascoe, 1862
- Goephanomimus Breuning, 1958
- Granastyochus Gilmour, 1959
- Graphisurus Kirby, 1837
- Hamatastus Gilmour, 1957
- Hexacona Bates, 1881
- Hiekeia Breuning, 1964
- Hoplomelas Fairmaire, 1896
- Hoploranomimus Breuning, 1959
- Hylettus Bates, 1864
- Hyperplatys Haldeman, 1847
- Idephrynus Bates, 1881
- Inermoleiopus Breuning, 1958
- Intricatotrypanius Breuning, 1959
- Ipochira Pascoe, 1864
- Isse Pascoe, 1864
- Jordanoleiopus Lepesme & Breuning, 1955
- Kallyntrosternidius Vitali, 2009
- Lagocheirus Dejean, 1835
- Lasiolepturges Melzer, 1928
- Lathroeus Thomson, 1864
- Lebisia Breuning, 1958
- Leiopus Audinet-Serville, 1835
- Leptocometes Bates, 1881
- Leptostylopsis Dillon, 1956
- Leptostylus LeConte, 1852
- Leptrichillus Gilmour, 1960
- Lepturdrys Gilmour, 1960
- Lepturgantes Gilmour, 1957
- Lepturges Bates, 1863
- Lepturginus Gilmour, 1959
- Lepturgotrichona Gilmour, 1957
- Lethes Zayas, 1975
- Liopinus Linsley and Chemsak, 1995
- Lithargyrus Martins & Monné, 1974
- Longilepturges Monne & Monne, 2011
- Lophopoenopsis Melzer, 1931
- Lophopoeum Bates, 1863
- Maculileiopus Breuning, 1958
- Mahenes Aurivillius, 1922
- Mahenoides Breuning, 1958
- Maublancancylistes Lepesme & Breuning, 1956
- Mecotetartus Bates, 1872
- Metadriopea Breuning, 1977
- Miaenia Pascoe, 1864
- Microhoplomelas Breuning, 1958
- Microplia Audinet-Serville, 1835
- Micurus Fairmaire, 1896
- Mimacanthocinus Breuning, 1958
- Mimaderpas Breuning, 1973
- Mimagnia Breuning, 1958
- Mimancylistes Breuning, 1955
- Mimapomecyna Breuning, 1958
- Mimectatina Aurivillius, 1928
- Mimeryssamena Breuning, 1971
- Mimexocentroides Breuning, 1961
- Mimexocentrus Breuning, 1958
- Mimhoplomelas Breuning, 1971
- Mimillaena Breuning, 1958
- Mimipochira Breuning, 1956
- Mimocoedomea Breuning, 1940
- Mimodriopea Breuning, 1977
- Mimohoplorana Breuning, 1960
- Mimoleiopus Breuning, 1969
- Mimomyromeus Breuning, 1978
- Mimosophronica Breuning, 1957
- Mimostenellipsis Breuning, 1956
- Mimotrypanius Breuning, 1973
- Mimoxenolea Breuning, 1960
- Mimozygoceropsis Breuning, 1978
- Moala Dillon & Dillon, 1952
- Myrmecoclytus Fairmaire, 1895
- Myrmexocentroides Breuning, 1970
- Myromeus Pascoe, 1864
- Myromexocentrus Breuning, 1957
- Nanustes Gilmour, 1960
- Neacanista Gressitt, 1940
- Nealcidion Monné, 1977
- Neobaryssinus Monné & Martins, 1976
- Neoeutrypanus Monné, 1977
- Neoischnolea Breuning, 1961
- Neopalame Martins & Monné, 1972
- Neosciadella Dillon & Dillon, 1952
- Neseuterpia Villiers, 1980
- Nesomomus Pascoe, 1864
- Nonymodiadelia Breuning, 1958
- Nyssocarinus Gilmour, 1960
- Nyssocuneus Gilmour, 1960
- Nyssodectes Dillon, 1955
- Nyssodrysilla Gilmour, 1962
- Nyssodrysina Casey, 1913
- Nyssodrysternum Gilmour, 1960
- Nyssosternus Gilmour, 1963
- Odontozineus Monné, 2009
- Oectropsis Blanchard in Gay, 1851
- Oedopeza Audinet-Serville, 1835
- Olenosus Bates, 1872
- Olmotega Pascoe, 1864
- Ombrosaga Pascoe, 1864
- Onalcidion Thomson, 1864
- Ophthalmemeopedus Breuning, 1961
- Ostedes Pascoe, 1859
- Othelais Pascoe, 1866
- Oxathres Bates, 1864
- Oxathridia Gilmour, 1963
- Ozineus Bates, 1863
- Palame Bates, 1864
- Parabaryssinus Monné, 2009
- Paracanthocinus Breuning, 1965
- Paracartus Hunt & Breuning, 1957
- Parachydaeopsis Breuning, 1968
- Paracleodoxus Monné & Monné, 2010
- Paraclodia Breuning, 1974
- Paracristenes Breuning, 1970
- Paracristocentrus Breuning, 1980
- Paradidymocentrus Breuning, 1956
- Paradriopea Breuning, 1965
- Paraegocidnus Breuning, 1956
- Parahiekeia Breuning, 1977
- Paralcidion Gilmour, 1957
- Paraleiopus Breuning, 1956
- Paramyromeus Breuning, 1956
- Parancylistes Breuning, 1958
- Paranisopodus Monné & Martins, 1976
- Paraphelileiopus Lepesme & Breuning, 1955
- Paraprobatius Breuning, 1955
- Paratenthras Monne, 1988
- Paratrichonius Monne & Monne, 2011
- Paroectropsis Cerda, 1954
- Paroecus Bates, 1863
- Pattalinus Bates, 1881
- Pentheochaetes Melzer, 1932
- Pertyia Aurivillius, 1922
- Phrissolaus Bates, 1881
- Piezochaerus Melzer, 1932
- Probatiomimus Melzer, 1926
- Proseriphus Monne, 2005
- Proxatrypanius Gilmour, 1959
- Pseudastylopsis Dillon, 1956
- Pseudocobelura Martins & Monne, 1974
- Pseudocriopsis Melzer, 1931
- Pseudolepturges Gilmour, 1957
- Pseudosparna Mermudes & Monne, 2009
- Pucallpa Lane, 1959
- Pygmaleptostylus Gilmour, 1963
- Sciadosoma Melzer, 1934
- Sporetus Bates, 1864
- Stenolis Bates, 1864
- Sternacutus Gilmour, 1961
- Sternidius LeConte, 1873
- Sternidocinus Dillon, 1956
- Styloleptoides Chalumeau, 1983
- Styloleptus Dillon, 1956
- Sympagus Bates, 1881
- Tenthras Thomson, 1864
- Tomrogersia Fragoso, 1980
- Toronaeus Bates, 1864
- Trichalcidion Monne & Delfino, 1981
- Trichalphus Bates, 1881
- Trichastylopsis Dillon, 1956
- Trichillurges Gilmour, 1961
- Trichocanonura Dillon, 1956
- Trichonius Bates, 1864
- Trichonyssodrys Gilmour, 1957
- Trichorondonia Breuning, 1965
- Trichotithonus Monne, 1990
- Tropanisopodus Tippmann, 1960
- Tropidocoleus Monne, 2009
- Tropidozineus Monne & Martins, 1976
- Trypanidiellus Monne & Delfino, 1980
- Trypanidius Blanchard, 1843
- Tuberastyochus 1959
- Urgleptes Dillon, 1956
- Valenus Casey, 1892
- Xenocona Gilmour, 1960
- Xenostylus Bates, 1885
- Xylergates Bates, 1864
- Xylergatoides Gilmour, 1962
- Xylotoles Newman, 1840
- Zambiana Ozdikmen, 2008
