= Georgeana =

Georgeana may refer to:

- Georgeana (name), a feminine given name
- Original name for York, Maine, a town
- Georgeana (beetle), a species of beetle
