= Styloleptoides inflaticollis =

Scientific classification
- Kingdom: Animalia
- Phylum: Arthropoda
- Class: Insecta
- Order: Coleoptera
- Suborder: Polyphaga
- Infraorder: Cucujiformia
- Family: Cerambycidae
- Subfamily: Lamiinae
- Tribe: Acanthocinini
- Genus: Styloleptoides
- Species: S. inflaticollis

Binomial name
- Styloleptoides inflaticollis (Chemsak, 1966)

Synonyms
- Leptostylus inflaticollis Chemsak, Linsley & Noguera, 1992; Styloleptus inflaticollis Lingafelter & Micheli, 2004

Species of beetle

Styloleptoides inflaticollis is a species of longhorned beetle in the family Cerambycidae, found in the Virgin Islands.
