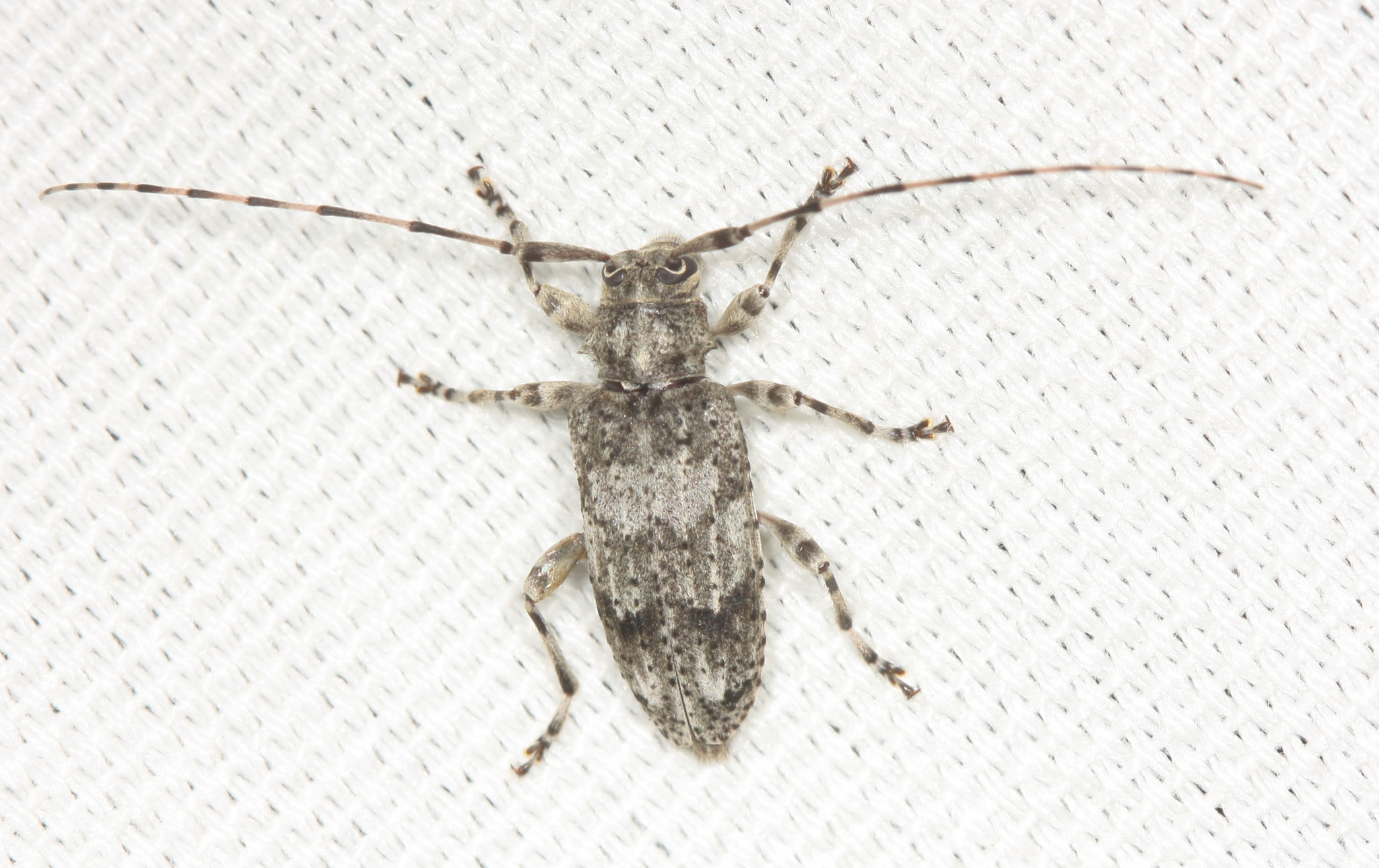
- Sternidocinus barbarus, California

Scientific classification
- Domain: Eukaryota
- Kingdom: Animalia
- Phylum: Arthropoda
- Class: Insecta
- Order: Coleoptera
- Suborder: Polyphaga
- Infraorder: Cucujiformia
- Family: Cerambycidae
- Subfamily: Lamiinae
- Tribe: Acanthocinini
- Genus: Sternidocinus; Dillon, 1956
- Species: S. barbarus

Binomial name
- Sternidocinus barbarus (Van Dyke, 1920)

= Sternidocinus =

Genus and species of beetles

Sternidocinus is a genus of flat-faced longhorns in the beetle family Cerambycidae. This genus has a single species, Sternidocinus barbarus, found in California.
