= Maculileiopus =

Scientific classification
- Kingdom: Animalia
- Phylum: Arthropoda
- Class: Insecta
- Order: Coleoptera
- Suborder: Polyphaga
- Infraorder: Cucujiformia
- Family: Cerambycidae
- Tribe: Acanthocinini
- Genus: Maculileiopus

Genus of beetles

Maculileiopus is a genus of beetles in the family Cerambycidae, containing the following species:

- Maculileiopus kalshoveni Breuning, 1957
- Maculileiopus maculipennis Breuning, 1958
