= Styloleptoides =

Scientific classification
- Domain: Eukaryota
- Kingdom: Animalia
- Phylum: Arthropoda
- Class: Insecta
- Order: Coleoptera
- Suborder: Polyphaga
- Infraorder: Cucujiformia
- Family: Cerambycidae
- Subfamily: Lamiinae
- Tribe: Acanthocinini
- Genus: Styloleptoides; Chalumeau, 1983

Genus of beetles

Styloleptoides is a genus of longhorned beetles in the family Cerambycidae. There are at least three described species in Styloleptoides.

== Species ==
These three species belong to the genus Styloleptoides:

- Styloleptoides inflaticollis (Chemsak, 1966) (Virgin Islands)
- Styloleptoides morazzanii Chalumeau, 1983 (Guadeloupe)
- Styloleptoides parvulus (Gahan, 1895) (Grenada, Saint Vincent and the Grenadines)
