= Driopea delta =

Scientific classification
- Kingdom: Animalia
- Phylum: Arthropoda
- Class: Insecta
- Order: Coleoptera
- Suborder: Polyphaga
- Infraorder: Cucujiformia
- Family: Cerambycidae
- Genus: Driopea
- Species: D. delta

Binomial name
- Driopea delta Aurivillius, 1922

Species of beetle

Driopea delta is a species of beetle in the family Cerambycidae. It was described by Per Olof Christopher Aurivillius in 1922.
