= Erphaea pumicosa =

Scientific classification
- Kingdom: Animalia
- Phylum: Arthropoda
- Class: Insecta
- Order: Coleoptera
- Suborder: Polyphaga
- Infraorder: Cucujiformia
- Family: Cerambycidae
- Genus: Erphaea
- Species: E. pumicosa

Binomial name
- Erphaea pumicosa Erichson, 1847

Species of beetle

Erphaea pumicosa is a species of longhorn beetle of the subfamily Lamiinae. It was described by Wilhelm Ferdinand Erichson in 1847, and is known from Peru, Bolivia, and eastern Ecuador.
