= Trichastylopsis =

Scientific classification
- Kingdom: Animalia
- Phylum: Arthropoda
- Class: Insecta
- Order: Coleoptera
- Suborder: Polyphaga
- Infraorder: Cucujiformia
- Family: Cerambycidae
- Tribe: Acanthocinini
- Genus: Trichastylopsis; Dillon, 1956

Genus of beetles

Trichastylopsis is a longhorn beetle genus of the subfamily Lamiinae named by Lawrence S. Dillon in 1956.

== Species ==
- Trichastylopsis albidus (LeConte, 1852)
- Trichastylopsis hoguei Chemsak & Linsley, 1978
