= Oxathres ornata =

Scientific classification
- Kingdom: Animalia
- Phylum: Arthropoda
- Class: Insecta
- Order: Coleoptera
- Suborder: Polyphaga
- Infraorder: Cucujiformia
- Family: Cerambycidae
- Genus: Oxathres
- Species: O. ornata

Binomial name
- Oxathres ornata Monné, 1976

Species of beetle

Oxathres ornata is a species of beetle in the family Cerambycidae. It was described by Monné in 1976.
