= Erphaea =

Scientific classification
- Kingdom: Animalia
- Phylum: Arthropoda
- Class: Insecta
- Order: Coleoptera
- Suborder: Polyphaga
- Infraorder: Cucujiformia
- Family: Cerambycidae
- Tribe: Acanthocinini
- Genus: Erphaea

Genus of beetles

Erphaea is a genus of beetles in the family Cerambycidae, containing the following species:

- Erphaea pumicosa Erichson, 1847
- Erphaea stigma Martins & Monné, 1974
