= Parachydaeopsis laosica =

Scientific classification
- Kingdom: Animalia
- Phylum: Arthropoda
- Clade: Pancrustacea
- Class: Insecta
- Order: Coleoptera
- Suborder: Polyphaga
- Infraorder: Cucujiformia
- Family: Cerambycidae
- Genus: Parachydaeopsis
- Species: P. laosica

Binomial name
- Parachydaeopsis laosica Breuning, 1968

Species of beetle

Parachydaeopsis laosica is a species of beetle in the family Cerambycidae. It was described by Breuning in 1968.
