= Pattalinus cultus =

Scientific classification
- Kingdom: Animalia
- Phylum: Arthropoda
- Class: Insecta
- Order: Coleoptera
- Suborder: Polyphaga
- Infraorder: Cucujiformia
- Family: Cerambycidae
- Genus: Pattalinus
- Species: P. cultus

Binomial name
- Pattalinus cultus Bates, 1881

Species of beetle

Pattalinus cultus is a species of beetle in the family Cerambycidae. It was described by Bates in 1881.
