= Isse punctata =

Scientific classification
- Kingdom: Animalia
- Phylum: Arthropoda
- Class: Insecta
- Order: Coleoptera
- Suborder: Polyphaga
- Infraorder: Cucujiformia
- Family: Cerambycidae
- Subfamily: Lamiinae
- Tribe: Acanthocinini
- Genus: Isse; Pascoe, 1864
- Species: I. punctata

Binomial name
- Isse punctata Pascoe, 1864

Genus of beetles

Isse is a genus in the longhorn beetle family Cerambycidae. This genus has a single species, Isse punctata, found in South Africa.
