= Driopea atronotata =

Scientific classification
- Kingdom: Animalia
- Phylum: Arthropoda
- Class: Insecta
- Order: Coleoptera
- Suborder: Polyphaga
- Infraorder: Cucujiformia
- Family: Cerambycidae
- Genus: Driopea
- Species: D. atronotata

Binomial name
- Driopea atronotata Pic, 1929

Species of beetle

Driopea atronotata is a species of beetle in the family Cerambycidae. It was described by Pic in 1929.
