= Driopea schmidi =

Scientific classification
- Kingdom: Animalia
- Phylum: Arthropoda
- Class: Insecta
- Order: Coleoptera
- Suborder: Polyphaga
- Infraorder: Cucujiformia
- Family: Cerambycidae
- Genus: Driopea
- Species: D. schmidi

Binomial name
- Driopea schmidi Breuning, 1971

Species of beetle

Driopea schmidi is a species of beetle in the family Cerambycidae. It was described by Breuning in 1971.
