= Pseudosparna boliviana =

Scientific classification
- Kingdom: Animalia
- Phylum: Arthropoda
- Class: Insecta
- Order: Coleoptera
- Suborder: Polyphaga
- Infraorder: Cucujiformia
- Family: Cerambycidae
- Genus: Pseudosparna
- Species: P. boliviana

Binomial name
- Pseudosparna boliviana Monne & Monne, 2011

Species of beetle

Pseudosparna boliviana is a species of beetle in the family Cerambycidae. It was described by Monne and Monne in 2011.
