= Pattalinus mirificus =

Scientific classification
- Kingdom: Animalia
- Phylum: Arthropoda
- Class: Insecta
- Order: Coleoptera
- Suborder: Polyphaga
- Infraorder: Cucujiformia
- Family: Cerambycidae
- Genus: Pattalinus
- Species: P. mirificus

Binomial name
- Pattalinus mirificus (Gilmour, 1961)

Species of beetle

Pattalinus mirificus is a species of beetle in the family Cerambycidae. It was described by Gilmour in 1961.
