= Mimagnia =

Scientific classification
- Kingdom: Animalia
- Phylum: Arthropoda
- Class: Insecta
- Order: Coleoptera
- Suborder: Polyphaga
- Infraorder: Cucujiformia
- Family: Cerambycidae
- Tribe: Acanthocinini
- Genus: Mimagnia; Breuning, 1958
- Species: M. quadrifasciata

Binomial name
- Mimagnia quadrifasciata (Fauvel, 1906)

Synonyms
- Falsagnioides Breuning, 1972

Genus of beetles

Mimagnia is a genus of longhorned beetles in the family Cerambycidae. This genus has a single species, Mimagnia quadrifasciata, found in New Caledonia.
