= Longilepturges =

Scientific classification
- Kingdom: Animalia
- Phylum: Arthropoda
- Class: Insecta
- Order: Coleoptera
- Suborder: Polyphaga
- Infraorder: Cucujiformia
- Family: Cerambycidae
- Tribe: Acanthocinini
- Genus: Longilepturges

Genus of beetles

Longilepturges is a genus of beetles in the family Cerambycidae, containing the following species:

- Longilepturges bicolor Monne & Monne, 2011
- Longilepturges xantholineatus Monne & Monne, 2011
