= Sympagus =

Scientific classification
- Domain: Eukaryota
- Kingdom: Animalia
- Phylum: Arthropoda
- Class: Insecta
- Order: Coleoptera
- Suborder: Polyphaga
- Infraorder: Cucujiformia
- Family: Cerambycidae
- Tribe: Acanthocinini
- Genus: Sympagus

Genus of beetles

Sympagus is a genus of beetles in the family Cerambycidae, containing the following species:

- Sympagus bimaculatus (Gilmour, 1958)
- Sympagus buckleyi (Bates, 1885)
- Sympagus cedrelis Hovore & Toledo, 2006
- Sympagus favorabilis Tippmann, 1960
- Sympagus laetabilis (Bates, 1872)
- Sympagus monnei Hovore & Toledo, 2006
