= Neobaryssinus =

Scientific classification
- Kingdom: Animalia
- Phylum: Arthropoda
- Class: Insecta
- Order: Coleoptera
- Suborder: Polyphaga
- Infraorder: Cucujiformia
- Family: Cerambycidae
- Tribe: Acanthocinini
- Genus: Neobaryssinus

Genus of beetles

Neobaryssinus is a genus of beetles in the family Cerambycidae, containing the following species:

- Neobaryssinus altissimus Berkov & Monne, 2010
- Neobaryssinus capixaba Monné & Delfino, 1980
- Neobaryssinus marianae (Martins & Monné, 1974)
- Neobaryssinus phalarus Monné & Martins, 1976
