= Colobeutrypanus =

Scientific classification
- Kingdom: Animalia
- Phylum: Arthropoda
- Class: Insecta
- Order: Coleoptera
- Suborder: Polyphaga
- Infraorder: Cucujiformia
- Family: Cerambycidae
- Tribe: Acanthocinini
- Genus: Colobeutrypanus; Tippmann, 1953

Genus of beetles

Colobeutrypanus is a genus of beetle in the family Cerambycidae, with two species, both from the Neotropical region The species are C. ornatus Tippmann, 1953 and C. barclayi Monné & Monné, 2012.
