= Myromexocentrus =

Scientific classification
- Kingdom: Animalia
- Phylum: Arthropoda
- Class: Insecta
- Order: Coleoptera
- Suborder: Polyphaga
- Infraorder: Cucujiformia
- Family: Cerambycidae
- Subfamily: Lamiinae
- Tribe: Acanthocinini
- Genus: Myromexocentrus; Breuning, 1957

Genus of beetles

Myromexocentrus is a genus of longhorned beetles in the family Cerambycidae. There are at least two described species in Myromexocentrus.

== Species ==
These two species belong to the genus Myromexocentrus:

- Myromexocentrus quadrimaculatus Hayashi, 1983 (Taiwan)
- Myromexocentrus tibialis Breuning, 1957 (Vietnam)
