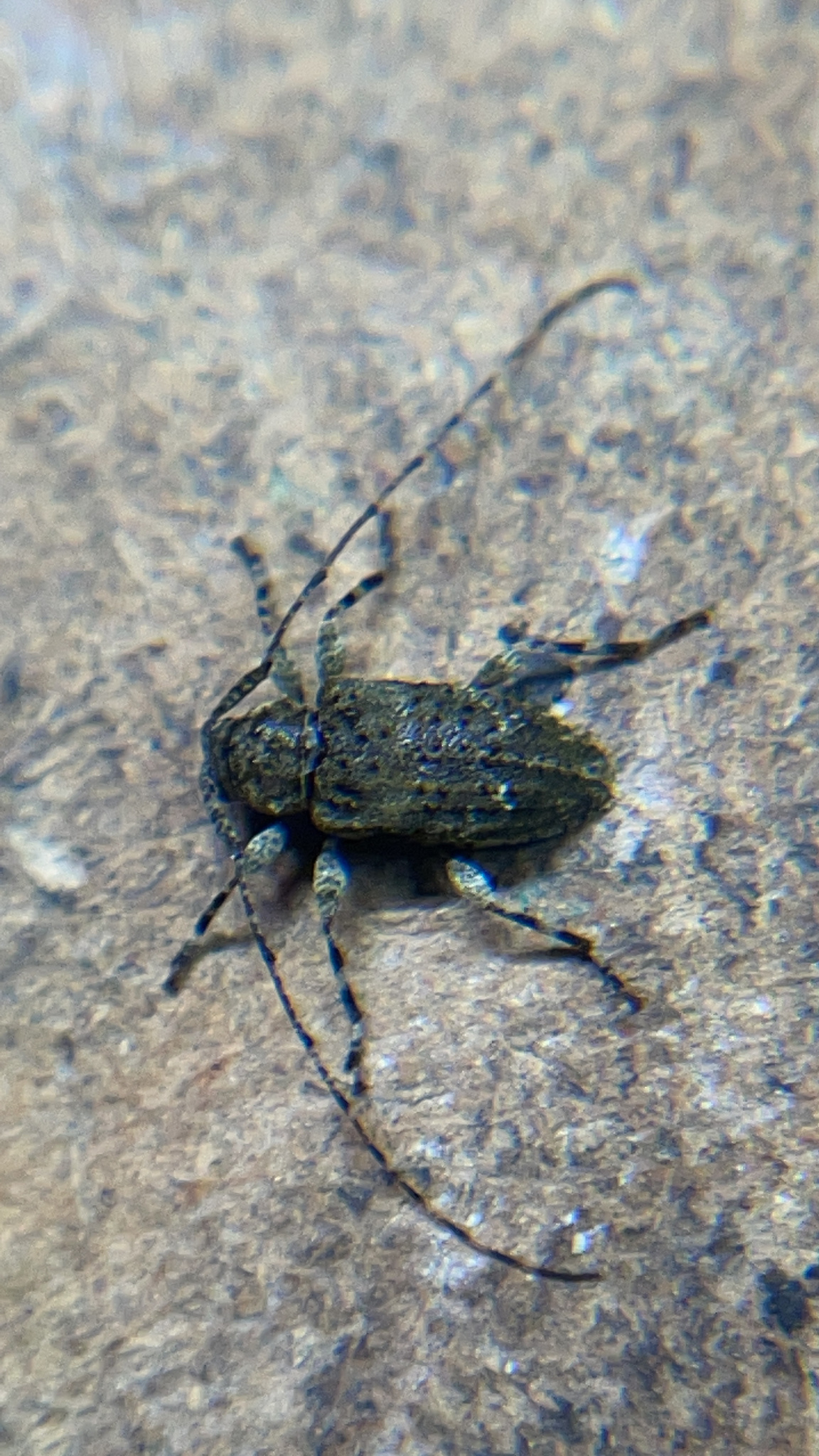

Scientific classification
- Kingdom: Animalia
- Phylum: Arthropoda
- Class: Insecta
- Order: Coleoptera
- Suborder: Polyphaga
- Infraorder: Cucujiformia
- Family: Cerambycidae
- Tribe: Acanthocinini
- Genus: Astylidius; Casey, 1913
- Species: A. parvus

Binomial name
- Astylidius parvus (LeConte, 1873)

= Astylidius =

Genus of beetles

Astylidius is a monotypic longhorn beetle genus of the subfamily Lamiinae described by Thomas Lincoln Casey Jr. in 1913. Its only species, Astylidius parvus, was described by John Lawrence LeConte in 1873.
