= Baecacanthus =

Scientific classification
- Kingdom: Animalia
- Phylum: Arthropoda
- Class: Insecta
- Order: Coleoptera
- Suborder: Polyphaga
- Infraorder: Cucujiformia
- Family: Cerambycidae
- Tribe: Acanthocinini
- Genus: Baecacanthus; Monné, 1975

Genus of beetles

Baecacanthus is a genus of beetles in the family Cerambycidae, which contains Baecacanthus telamon and Baecacanthus trifasciatus. Both species were described be Monné in 1975 in Rio de Janeiro, Brazil.
