= Trichastylopsis albidus =

Scientific classification
- Kingdom: Animalia
- Phylum: Arthropoda
- Class: Insecta
- Order: Coleoptera
- Suborder: Polyphaga
- Infraorder: Cucujiformia
- Family: Cerambycidae
- Genus: Trichastylopsis
- Species: T. albidus

Binomial name
- Trichastylopsis albidus (LeConte, 1852)

Species of beetles

Trichastylopsis albidus is a longhorn beetle species of the subfamily Lamiinae described by John Lawrence LeConte in 1852.
