= Sympagus favorabilis =

Scientific classification
- Domain: Eukaryota
- Kingdom: Animalia
- Phylum: Arthropoda
- Class: Insecta
- Order: Coleoptera
- Suborder: Polyphaga
- Infraorder: Cucujiformia
- Family: Cerambycidae
- Genus: Sympagus
- Species: S. favorabilis

Binomial name
- Sympagus favorabilis Tippmann, 1960

Species of beetle

Sympagus favorabilis is a species of beetle in the family Cerambycidae. It was described by Tippmann in 1960.
