= Neobaryssinus marianae =

Scientific classification
- Kingdom: Animalia
- Phylum: Arthropoda
- Class: Insecta
- Order: Coleoptera
- Suborder: Polyphaga
- Infraorder: Cucujiformia
- Family: Cerambycidae
- Genus: Neobaryssinus
- Species: N. marianae

Binomial name
- Neobaryssinus marianae (Martins & Monné, 1974)

Species of beetle

Neobaryssinus marianae is a species of beetle in the family Cerambycidae. It was described by Martins and Monné in 1974.
