= Aegocidnexocentrus =

Scientific classification
- Kingdom: Animalia
- Phylum: Arthropoda
- Class: Insecta
- Order: Coleoptera
- Suborder: Polyphaga
- Infraorder: Cucujiformia
- Family: Cerambycidae
- Tribe: Acanthocinini
- Genus: Aegocidnexocentrus
- Species: A. tippmanni

Binomial name
- Aegocidnexocentrus tippmanni Breuning, 1957

Genus of beetles

Aegocidnexocentrus is a genus of beetles in the family Cerambycidae, containing a single species, Aegocidnexocentrus tippmanni. It was described by Stephan von Breuning in 1957.
