= Sympagus cedrelis =

Scientific classification
- Domain: Eukaryota
- Kingdom: Animalia
- Phylum: Arthropoda
- Class: Insecta
- Order: Coleoptera
- Suborder: Polyphaga
- Infraorder: Cucujiformia
- Family: Cerambycidae
- Genus: Sympagus
- Species: S. cedrelis

Binomial name
- Sympagus cedrelis Hovore & Toledo, 2006

Species of beetle

Sympagus cedrelis is a species of beetle in the family Cerambycidae. It was described by Hovore and Toledo in 2006.
