= Didymocentrotus =

Scientific classification
- Kingdom: Animalia
- Phylum: Arthropoda
- Class: Insecta
- Order: Coleoptera
- Suborder: Polyphaga
- Infraorder: Cucujiformia
- Family: Cerambycidae
- Tribe: Acanthocinini
- Genus: Didymocentrotus; McKeown, 1945
- Species: D. foveatus

Binomial name
- Didymocentrotus foveatus (Aurivillius, 1917)

Genus of beetles

Didymocentrotus is a monotypic genus in the family Cerambycidae described by Keith Collingwood McKeown in 1945. Its single species, Didymocentrotus foveatus, was described by Per Olof Christopher Aurivillius in 1917.
