= Erphaea stigma =

Scientific classification
- Kingdom: Animalia
- Phylum: Arthropoda
- Class: Insecta
- Order: Coleoptera
- Suborder: Polyphaga
- Infraorder: Cucujiformia
- Family: Cerambycidae
- Genus: Erphaea
- Species: E. stigma

Binomial name
- Erphaea stigma Martins & Monné, 1974

Species of beetle

Erphaea stigma is a species of longhorn beetles of the subfamily Lamiinae. It was described by Martins and Monné in 1974, and is known from northwestern Brazil, French Guiana, and eastern Ecuador.
