= Driopea griseobasalis =

Scientific classification
- Kingdom: Animalia
- Phylum: Arthropoda
- Class: Insecta
- Order: Coleoptera
- Suborder: Polyphaga
- Infraorder: Cucujiformia
- Family: Cerambycidae
- Genus: Driopea
- Species: D. griseobasalis

Binomial name
- Driopea griseobasalis (Breuning, 1968)

Species of beetle

Driopea griseobasalis is a species of Longhorn beetle. The scientific name was first published in 1968 by Breuning.
