= Driopea nigrofasciata =

Scientific classification
- Kingdom: Animalia
- Phylum: Arthropoda
- Class: Insecta
- Order: Coleoptera
- Suborder: Polyphaga
- Infraorder: Cucujiformia
- Family: Cerambycidae
- Genus: Driopea
- Species: D. nigrofasciata

Binomial name
- Driopea nigrofasciata Pic, 1926

Species of beetle

Driopea nigrofasciata is a species of beetle in the family Cerambycidae. It was described by Pic in 1926.
