= Mahenoides =

Scientific classification
- Domain: Eukaryota
- Kingdom: Animalia
- Phylum: Arthropoda
- Class: Insecta
- Order: Coleoptera
- Suborder: Polyphaga
- Infraorder: Cucujiformia
- Family: Cerambycidae
- Subfamily: Lamiinae
- Tribe: Acanthocinini
- Genus: Mahenoides; Breuning, 1958
- Species: M. pauliani

Binomial name
- Mahenoides pauliani Breuning, 1957

Genus of beetles

Mahenoides is a genus of longhorned beetles in the family Cerambycidae. This genus has a single species, Mahenoides pauliani, found in Madagascar.
