= Pseudosparna amoena =

Scientific classification
- Kingdom: Animalia
- Phylum: Arthropoda
- Class: Insecta
- Order: Coleoptera
- Suborder: Polyphaga
- Infraorder: Cucujiformia
- Family: Cerambycidae
- Genus: Pseudosparna
- Species: P. amoena

Binomial name
- Pseudosparna amoena Mermudes & Monne, 2009

Species of beetle

Pseudosparna amoena is a species of beetle in the family Cerambycidae. It was described by Mermudes and Monne in 2009.
