= Neobaryssinus altissimus =

Scientific classification
- Kingdom: Animalia
- Phylum: Arthropoda
- Class: Insecta
- Order: Coleoptera
- Suborder: Polyphaga
- Infraorder: Cucujiformia
- Family: Cerambycidae
- Genus: Neobaryssinus
- Species: N. altissimus

Binomial name
- Neobaryssinus altissimus Berkov & Monne, 2010

Species of beetle

Neobaryssinus altissimus is a species of beetle in the family Cerambycidae. It was described by Berkov and Monne in 2010.
