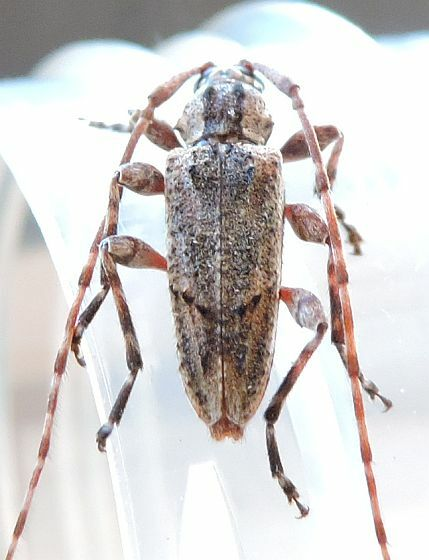
- Trichocanonura linearis, Arizona

Scientific classification
- Domain: Eukaryota
- Kingdom: Animalia
- Phylum: Arthropoda
- Class: Insecta
- Order: Coleoptera
- Suborder: Polyphaga
- Infraorder: Cucujiformia
- Family: Cerambycidae
- Subfamily: Lamiinae
- Tribe: Acanthocinini
- Genus: Trichocanonura; Dillon, 1956
- Species: T. linearis

Binomial name
- Trichocanonura linearis (Skinner, 1905)

= Trichocanonura =

Genus of beetles

Trichocanonura is a genus of flat-faced longhorns in the beetle family Cerambycidae. This genus has a single species, Trichocanonura linearis, found in the southwestern United States and Mexico.
