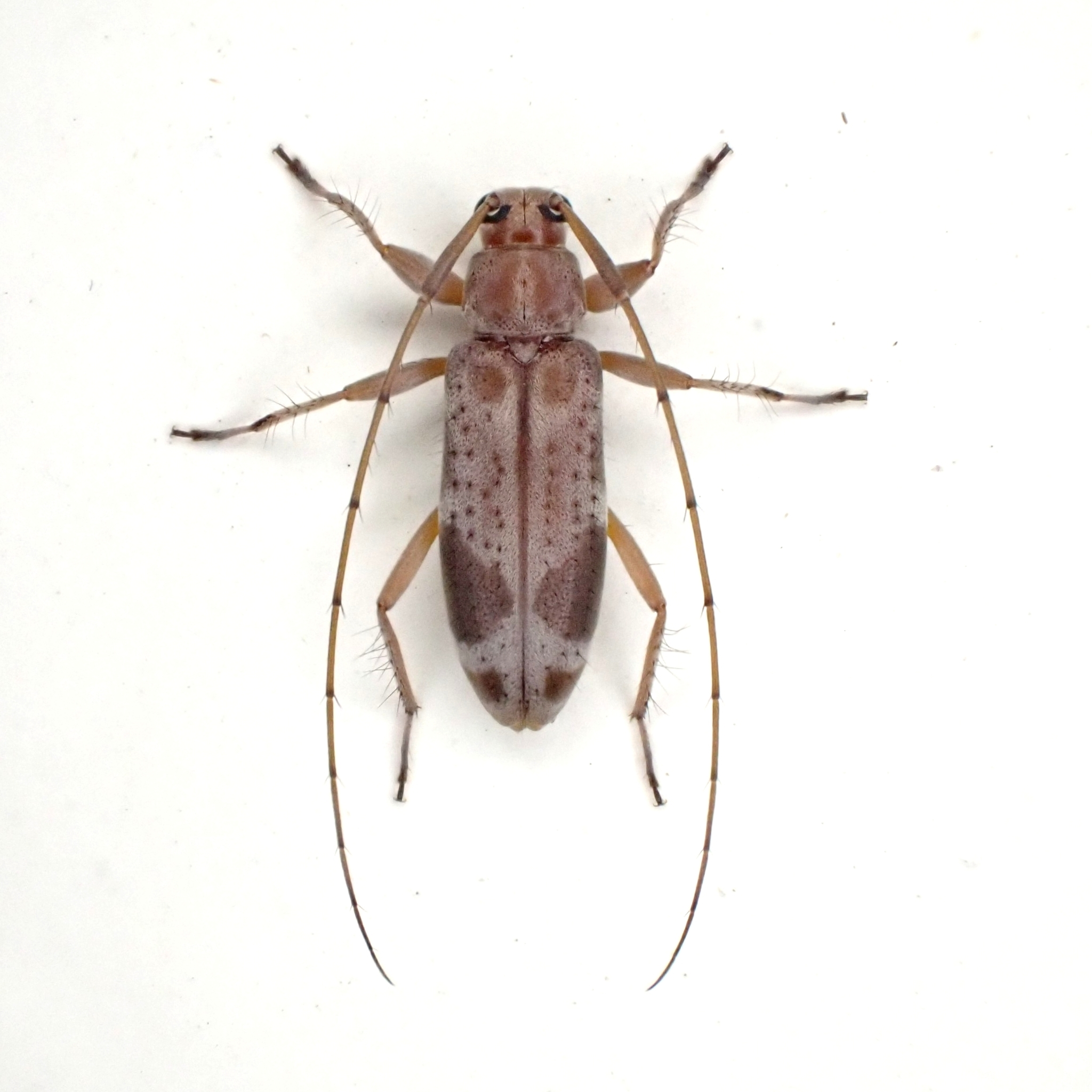

Scientific classification
- Kingdom: Animalia
- Phylum: Arthropoda
- Clade: Pancrustacea
- Class: Insecta
- Order: Coleoptera
- Suborder: Polyphaga
- Infraorder: Cucujiformia
- Family: Cerambycidae
- Subfamily: Lamiinae
- Tribe: Acanthocinini
- Genus: Lasiolepturges
- Species: L. zikani

Binomial name
- Lasiolepturges zikani Melzer, 1928

= Lasiolepturges =

Lasiolepturges zikani

Genus of beetles

Lasiolepturges zikani is a species of beetle in the family Cerambycidae, the only species in the genus Lasiolepturges.
