= Pattalinus =

Scientific classification
- Kingdom: Animalia
- Phylum: Arthropoda
- Class: Insecta
- Order: Coleoptera
- Suborder: Polyphaga
- Infraorder: Cucujiformia
- Family: Cerambycidae
- Tribe: Acanthocinini
- Genus: Pattalinus

Genus of beetles

Pattalinus is a genus of beetles in the family Cerambycidae, containing the following species:

- Pattalinus mirificus (Gilmour, 1961)
- Pattalinus charis Bates, 1881
- Pattalinus cultus Bates, 1881
- Pattalinus griseolus Monné, 1988
- Pattalinus lineatus Monné & Martins, 1976
- Pattalinus strigosus Monné, 1988
- Pattalinus vittulatus (Gilmour, 1961)
