= Driopea =

Scientific classification
- Kingdom: Animalia
- Phylum: Arthropoda
- Class: Insecta
- Order: Coleoptera
- Suborder: Polyphaga
- Infraorder: Cucujiformia
- Family: Cerambycidae
- Subfamily: Lamiinae
- Tribe: Acanthocinini
- Genus: Driopea; Pascoe, 1858

Genus of beetles

Driopea is a genus of beetles in the family Cerambycidae, containing the following species:

subgenus Driopea

- Driopea clytina Pascoe, 1858
- Driopea schmidi Breuning, 1971
- Driopea setosa Aurivillius, 1922

subgenus Fasciatodriopea

- Driopea chinensis Breuning, 1967
- Driopea griseobasalis Breuning, 1968
- Driopea nigrofasciata Pic, 1926

subgenus Inermodriopea

- Driopea atronotata Pic, 1929
- Driopea cyrtomera Aurivillius, 1922
- Driopea delta Aurivillius, 1922
- Driopea griseonotata Breuning, 1957
- Driopea inermis Pascoe, 1864
- Driopea nigromaculata Pic, 1926

subgenus Luteodriopea

- Driopea luteolineata Pic, 1926

subgenus Trichodriopea

- Driopea excavatipennis Breuning, 1980
