= Driopea inermis =

Scientific classification
- Kingdom: Animalia
- Phylum: Arthropoda
- Class: Insecta
- Order: Coleoptera
- Suborder: Polyphaga
- Infraorder: Cucujiformia
- Family: Cerambycidae
- Genus: Driopea
- Species: D. inermis

Binomial name
- Driopea inermis Pascoe, 1864

Species of beetle

Driopea inermis is a species of beetle in the family Cerambycidae. It was described by Pascoe in 1864.
