= Neobaryssinus capixaba =

Scientific classification
- Kingdom: Animalia
- Phylum: Arthropoda
- Class: Insecta
- Order: Coleoptera
- Suborder: Polyphaga
- Infraorder: Cucujiformia
- Family: Cerambycidae
- Genus: Neobaryssinus
- Species: N. capixaba

Binomial name
- Neobaryssinus capixaba Monné & Delfino, 1980

Species of beetle

Neobaryssinus capixaba is a species of beetle in the family Cerambycidae. It was described by Monné and Delfino in 1980.
