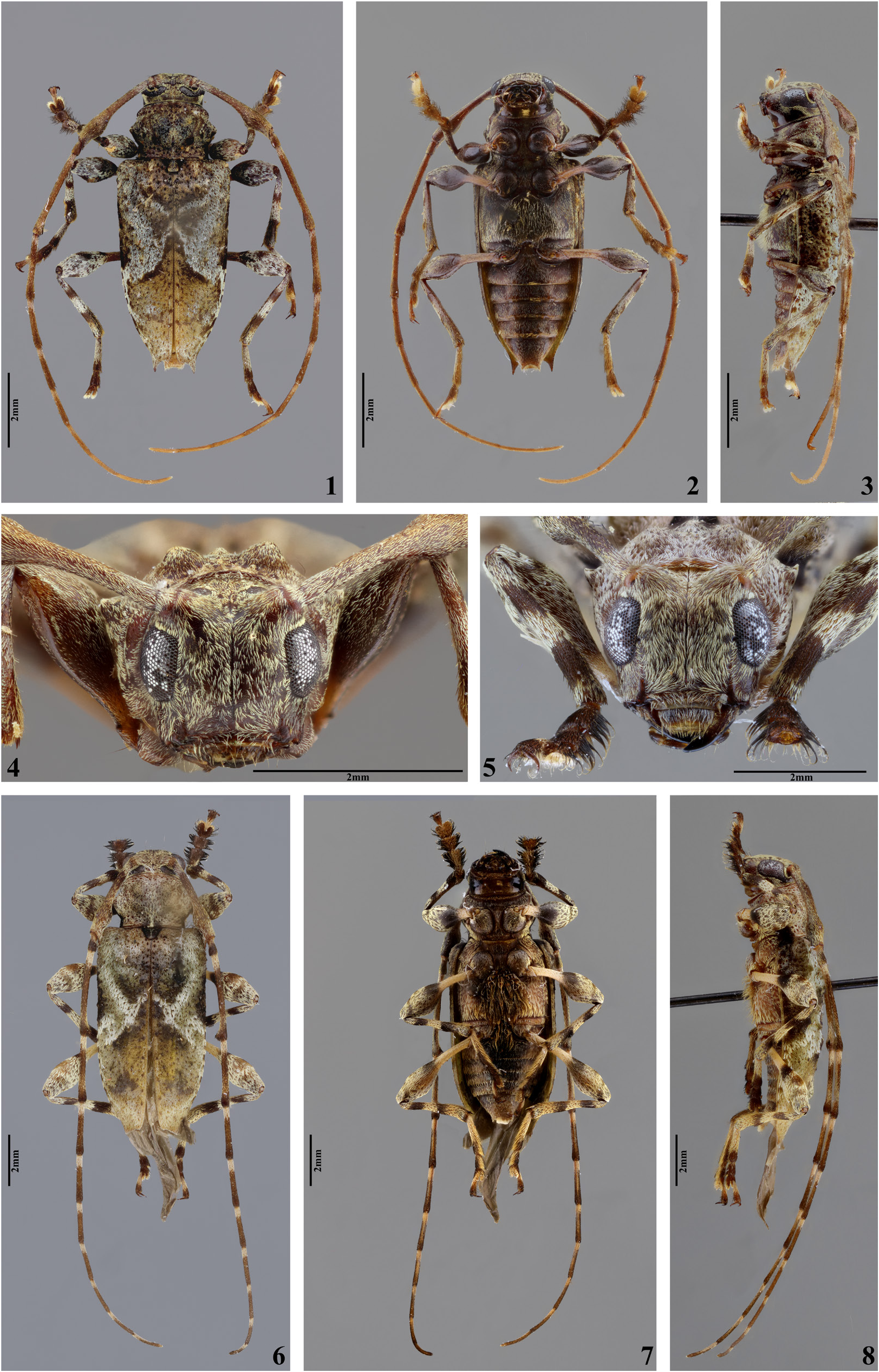

Scientific classification
- Kingdom: Animalia
- Phylum: Arthropoda
- Class: Insecta
- Order: Coleoptera
- Suborder: Polyphaga
- Infraorder: Cucujiformia
- Family: Cerambycidae
- Tribe: Acanthocinini
- Genus: Alcathousiella
- Species: A. polyrhaphoides

Binomial name
- Alcathousiella polyrhaphoides (White, 1855)

= Alcathousiella =

Genus of beetles

Alcathousiella is a genus of beetles in the family Cerambycidae, containing a single species, Alcathousiella polyrhaphoides.
