= Oxathres (beetle) =

Scientific classification
- Kingdom: Animalia
- Phylum: Arthropoda
- Class: Insecta
- Order: Coleoptera
- Suborder: Polyphaga
- Infraorder: Cucujiformia
- Family: Cerambycidae
- Tribe: Acanthocinini
- Genus: Oxathres

Genus of beetles

Oxathres is a genus of beetles in the family Cerambycidae, containing the following species:

- Oxathres boliviana Monne & Tavakilian, 2011
- Oxathres decorata Monné, 1990
- Oxathres erotyloides Bates, 1864
- Oxathres guyanensis Monne & Tavakilian, 2011
- Oxathres implicata Melzer, 1926
- Oxathres maculosa Monne & Tavakilian, 2011
- Oxathres muscosa Bates, 1864
- Oxathres navicula Bates, 1864
- Oxathres ornata Monné, 1976
- Oxathres proxima Monné, 1976
- Oxathres quadrimaculata Monné, 1976
- Oxathres scripta Lacordaire, 1872
- Oxathres sparsa Melzer, 1927
