= Oxathres implicata =

Scientific classification
- Kingdom: Animalia
- Phylum: Arthropoda
- Class: Insecta
- Order: Coleoptera
- Suborder: Polyphaga
- Infraorder: Cucujiformia
- Family: Cerambycidae
- Genus: Oxathres
- Species: O. implicata

Binomial name
- Oxathres implicata Melzer, 1926

Synonyms
- Oxathres implicata Gilmour, 1965

Species of beetle

Oxathres implicata is a species of beetle in the family Cerambycidae. It was described by Melzer in 1926.
