= Pseudosparna =

Scientific classification
- Kingdom: Animalia
- Phylum: Arthropoda
- Class: Insecta
- Order: Coleoptera
- Suborder: Polyphaga
- Infraorder: Cucujiformia
- Family: Cerambycidae
- Tribe: Acanthocinini
- Genus: Pseudosparna; Mermudes & Monné, 2009

Genus of beetles

Pseudosparna is a genus of beetles in the family Cerambycidae, containing the following species:

- Pseudosparna amoena Mermudes & Monne, 2009
- Pseudosparna antonkozlovi Santos-Silva & Nascimento, 2019
- Pseudosparna aragua Mermudes & Monne, 2009
- Pseudosparna boliviana Monne & Monne, 2011
- Pseudosparna flaviceps (Bates, 1863)
- Pseudosparna luteolineata Mermudes & Monne, 2009
- Pseudosparna mantis Devesa & Santos-Silva, 2020
- Pseudosparna pichincha Monné & Monné, 2014
- Pseudosparna triangulata Nascimento & McClarin, 2018
- Pseudosparna tucurui Monné & Monné, 2014
- Pseudosparna ubirajara Dalens & Touroult, 2015
