= Pattalinus griseolus =

Scientific classification
- Kingdom: Animalia
- Phylum: Arthropoda
- Class: Insecta
- Order: Coleoptera
- Suborder: Polyphaga
- Infraorder: Cucujiformia
- Family: Cerambycidae
- Genus: Pattalinus
- Species: P. griseolus

Binomial name
- Pattalinus griseolus Monné, 1988

Species of beetle

Pattalinus griseolus is a species of beetle in the family Cerambycidae. It was described by Monné in 1988.
