= Oxathres decorata =

Scientific classification
- Kingdom: Animalia
- Phylum: Arthropoda
- Class: Insecta
- Order: Coleoptera
- Suborder: Polyphaga
- Infraorder: Cucujiformia
- Family: Cerambycidae
- Genus: Oxathres
- Species: O. decorata

Binomial name
- Oxathres decorata Monné, 1990

Species of beetle

Oxathres decorata is a species of beetle in the family Cerambycidae. It was described by Monné in 1990.
