= Oxathres boliviana =

Scientific classification
- Kingdom: Animalia
- Phylum: Arthropoda
- Class: Insecta
- Order: Coleoptera
- Suborder: Polyphaga
- Infraorder: Cucujiformia
- Family: Cerambycidae
- Genus: Oxathres
- Species: O. boliviana

Binomial name
- Oxathres boliviana Monné & Tavakilian, 2011

Species of beetle

Oxathres boliviana is a species of beetle in the family Cerambycidae. It was described by Monné and Tavakilian in 2011.
