= Pseudosparna flaviceps =

Scientific classification
- Kingdom: Animalia
- Phylum: Arthropoda
- Class: Insecta
- Order: Coleoptera
- Suborder: Polyphaga
- Infraorder: Cucujiformia
- Family: Cerambycidae
- Genus: Pseudosparna
- Species: P. flaviceps

Binomial name
- Pseudosparna flaviceps (Bates, 1863)

Species of beetle

Pseudosparna flaviceps is a species of beetle in the family Cerambycidae. It was described by Bates in 1863.
