= Pseudocriopsis =

Scientific classification
- Kingdom: Animalia
- Phylum: Arthropoda
- Class: Insecta
- Order: Coleoptera
- Suborder: Polyphaga
- Infraorder: Cucujiformia
- Family: Cerambycidae
- Subfamily: Lamiinae
- Tribe: Acanthocinini
- Genus: Pseudocriopsis; Melzer, 1931

Genus of beetles

Pseudocriopsis is a genus of flat-faced longhorns in the beetle family Cerambycidae. There are at least two described species in Pseudocriopsis, found in Brazil.

== Species ==
These two species belong to the genus Pseudocriopsis:

- Pseudocriopsis abare Monné et al, 2020
- Pseudocriopsis modesta Melzer, 1931
