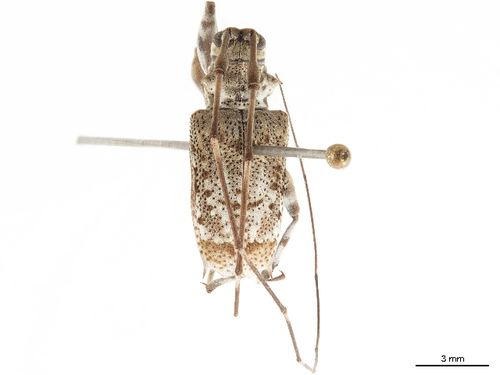
- Dorsal view (specimen SICOF850-19, collected in West New Guinea)
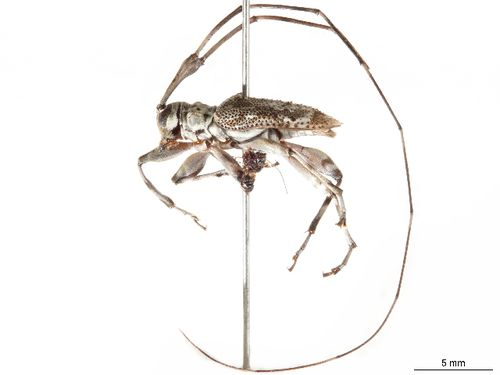
- Lateral view (specimen SICOF850-19, collected in West New Guinea)

Scientific classification
- Domain: Eukaryota
- Kingdom: Animalia
- Phylum: Arthropoda
- Class: Insecta
- Order: Coleoptera
- Suborder: Polyphaga
- Infraorder: Cucujiformia
- Family: Cerambycidae
- Tribe: Acanthocinini
- Genus: Acanista
- Species: A. alphoides

Binomial name
- Acanista alphoides Pascoe, 1864

= Acanista =

Genus of beetles

Acanista is a genus of beetles in the family Cerambycidae, containing a single species, Acanista alphoides. It was first described by Francis Polkinghorne Pascoe in 1864.
