= Neobaryssinus phalarus =

Scientific classification
- Kingdom: Animalia
- Phylum: Arthropoda
- Class: Insecta
- Order: Coleoptera
- Suborder: Polyphaga
- Infraorder: Cucujiformia
- Family: Cerambycidae
- Genus: Neobaryssinus
- Species: N. phalarus

Binomial name
- Neobaryssinus phalarus Monné & Martins, 1976

Species of beetle

Neobaryssinus phalarus is a species of beetle in the family Cerambycidae. It was described by Monné and Martins in 1976.
