= Pattalinus charis =

Scientific classification
- Kingdom: Animalia
- Phylum: Arthropoda
- Class: Insecta
- Order: Coleoptera
- Suborder: Polyphaga
- Infraorder: Cucujiformia
- Family: Cerambycidae
- Genus: Pattalinus
- Species: P. charis

Binomial name
- Pattalinus charis Bates, 1881

Species of beetle

Pattalinus charis is a species of beetle in the family Cerambycidae. It was described by Bates in 1881.
