= Driopea cyrtomera =

Scientific classification
- Kingdom: Animalia
- Phylum: Arthropoda
- Class: Insecta
- Order: Coleoptera
- Suborder: Polyphaga
- Infraorder: Cucujiformia
- Family: Cerambycidae
- Genus: Driopea
- Species: D. cyrtomera

Binomial name
- Driopea cyrtomera Aurivillius, 1922

Species of beetle

Driopea cyrtomera is a species of beetle in the family Cerambycidae. It was described by Per Olof Christopher Aurivillius in 1922. While larvae, these beetles usually drill into wood and can cause damage to trees or logged timber.
