= Longilepturges xantholineatus =

Scientific classification
- Kingdom: Animalia
- Phylum: Arthropoda
- Class: Insecta
- Order: Coleoptera
- Suborder: Polyphaga
- Infraorder: Cucujiformia
- Family: Cerambycidae
- Genus: Longilepturges
- Species: L. xantholineatus

Binomial name
- Longilepturges xantholineatus Monne & Monne, 2011

Species of beetle

Longilepturges xantholineatus is a species of beetle in the family Cerambycidae. It was described by Monne and Monne in 2011.
