= Driopea griseonotata =

Scientific classification
- Kingdom: Animalia
- Phylum: Arthropoda
- Class: Insecta
- Order: Coleoptera
- Suborder: Polyphaga
- Infraorder: Cucujiformia
- Family: Cerambycidae
- Genus: Driopea
- Species: D. griseonotata

Binomial name
- Driopea griseonotata Breuning, 1957

Species of beetle

Driopea griseonotata is a species of beetle in the family Cerambycidae. It was described by Breuning in 1957.
