= Parachydaeopsis shaanxiensis =

Scientific classification
- Kingdom: Animalia
- Phylum: Arthropoda
- Class: Insecta
- Order: Coleoptera
- Suborder: Polyphaga
- Infraorder: Cucujiformia
- Family: Cerambycidae
- Genus: Parachydaeopsis
- Species: P. shaanxiensis

Binomial name
- Parachydaeopsis shaanxiensis Wang & Chiang, 2002

Species of beetle

Parachydaeopsis shaanxiensis is a species of beetle in the family Cerambycidae. It was described by Wang and Chiang in 2002.
