= Carinoclodia =

Scientific classification
- Kingdom: Animalia
- Phylum: Arthropoda
- Class: Insecta
- Order: Coleoptera
- Suborder: Polyphaga
- Infraorder: Cucujiformia
- Family: Cerambycidae
- Tribe: Acanthocinini
- Genus: Carinoclodia
- Species: C. anancyloides

Binomial name
- Carinoclodia anancyloides Breuning, 1959

Genus of beetles

Carinoclodia anancyloides is a species of beetle in the family Cerambycidae, and the only species in the genus Carinoclodia. It was described by Breuning in 1959.
