= Oxathres muscosa =

Scientific classification
- Kingdom: Animalia
- Phylum: Arthropoda
- Class: Insecta
- Order: Coleoptera
- Suborder: Polyphaga
- Infraorder: Cucujiformia
- Family: Cerambycidae
- Genus: Oxathres
- Species: O. muscosa

Binomial name
- Oxathres muscosa Bates, 1864

Species of beetle

Oxathres muscosa is a species of beetle in the family Cerambycidae. It was described by Bates in 1864.
