= Parachydaeopsis =

Scientific classification
- Kingdom: Animalia
- Phylum: Arthropoda
- Class: Insecta
- Order: Coleoptera
- Suborder: Polyphaga
- Infraorder: Cucujiformia
- Family: Cerambycidae
- Tribe: Acanthocinini
- Genus: Parachydaeopsis

Genus of beetles

Parachydaeopsis is a genus of beetles in the family Cerambycidae, containing the following species:

- Parachydaeopsis laosica Breuning, 1968
- Parachydaeopsis shaanxiensis Wang & Chiang, 2002
