= Hoplomelas =

Scientific classification
- Kingdom: Animalia
- Phylum: Arthropoda
- Class: Insecta
- Order: Coleoptera
- Suborder: Polyphaga
- Infraorder: Cucujiformia
- Family: Cerambycidae
- Genus: Hoplomelas
- Species: H. albolineelus

Binomial name
- Hoplomelas albolineelus Fairmaire, 1896

Genus of beetles

Hoplomelas albolineelus is a species of beetle in the family Cerambycidae, and the only species in the genus Hoplomelas. It was described by Fairmaire in 1896.
