= Aphronastes =

Scientific classification
- Kingdom: Animalia
- Phylum: Arthropoda
- Class: Insecta
- Order: Coleoptera
- Suborder: Polyphaga
- Infraorder: Cucujiformia
- Family: Cerambycidae
- Genus: Aphronastes; Fairmaire, 1896
- Species: A. subfasciatus

Binomial name
- Aphronastes subfasciatus Fairmaire, 1896

Genus of beetles

Aphronastes subfasciatus is a species of beetle in the family Cerambycidae, and the only species in the genus Aphronastes. It was described by Léon Fairmaire in 1896.
