= Paracristocentrus =

Scientific classification
- Kingdom: Animalia
- Phylum: Arthropoda
- Class: Insecta
- Order: Coleoptera
- Suborder: Polyphaga
- Infraorder: Cucujiformia
- Family: Cerambycidae
- Genus: Paracristocentrus
- Species: P. vadoni

Binomial name
- Paracristocentrus vadoni Breuning, 1980

Genus of beetles

Paracristocentrus vadoni is a species of beetle in the family Cerambycidae, and the only species in the genus Paracristocentrus. It was described by Breuning in 1980.
