= Lepturdrys =

Lepturdrys novemlineata

Scientific classification
- Kingdom: Animalia
- Phylum: Arthropoda
- Class: Insecta
- Order: Coleoptera
- Suborder: Polyphaga
- Infraorder: Cucujiformia
- Family: Cerambycidae
- Genus: Lepturdrys
- Species: L. novemlineata

Binomial name
- Lepturdrys novemlineata Gilmour, 1960

Genus of beetles

Lepturdrys novemlineata is a species of beetle in the family Cerambycidae, the only species in the genus Lepturdrys.
