= Odontozineus =

Odontozineus penicillatus

Scientific classification
- Kingdom: Animalia
- Phylum: Arthropoda
- Class: Insecta
- Order: Coleoptera
- Suborder: Polyphaga
- Infraorder: Cucujiformia
- Family: Cerambycidae
- Genus: Odontozineus
- Species: O. penicillatus

Binomial name
- Odontozineus penicillatus Monne, 2009

Genus of beetles

Odontozineus penicillatus is a species of beetle in the family Cerambycidae, the only species in the genus Odontozineus.
