= Olmotega =

Scientific classification
- Kingdom: Animalia
- Phylum: Arthropoda
- Class: Insecta
- Order: Coleoptera
- Suborder: Polyphaga
- Infraorder: Cucujiformia
- Family: Cerambycidae
- Genus: Olmotega
- Species: O. cinerascens

Binomial name
- Olmotega cinerascens Pascoe, 1864

Genus of beetles

Olmotega cinerascens is a species of beetle in the family Cerambycidae, and the only species in the genus Olmotega. It was described by Pascoe in 1864.
