= Xenocona =

Xenocona pulchra

Scientific classification
- Kingdom: Animalia
- Phylum: Arthropoda
- Class: Insecta
- Order: Coleoptera
- Suborder: Polyphaga
- Infraorder: Cucujiformia
- Family: Cerambycidae
- Genus: Xenocona
- Species: X. pulchra

Binomial name
- Xenocona pulchra Gilmour, 1960

Genus of beetles

Xenocona pulchra is a species of beetle in the family Cerambycidae, the only species in the genus Xenocona.
