= Oxathridia =

Oxathridia roraimae

Scientific classification
- Kingdom: Animalia
- Phylum: Arthropoda
- Class: Insecta
- Order: Coleoptera
- Suborder: Polyphaga
- Infraorder: Cucujiformia
- Family: Cerambycidae
- Genus: Oxathridia
- Species: O. roraimae

Binomial name
- Oxathridia roraimae Gilmour, 1963

Genus of beetles

Oxathridia roraimae is a species of beetle in the family Cerambycidae, the only species in the genus Oxathridia.
