= Mimoleiopus =

Scientific classification
- Kingdom: Animalia
- Phylum: Arthropoda
- Class: Insecta
- Order: Coleoptera
- Suborder: Polyphaga
- Infraorder: Cucujiformia
- Family: Cerambycidae
- Genus: Mimoleiopus
- Species: M. sumatranus

Binomial name
- Mimoleiopus sumatranus Breuning, 1969

Genus of beetles

Mimoleiopus sumatranus is a species of beetle in the family Cerambycidae, and the only species in the genus Mimoleiopus. It was described by Breuning in 1969.
