= Cristocentrus =

Scientific classification
- Kingdom: Animalia
- Phylum: Arthropoda
- Class: Insecta
- Order: Coleoptera
- Suborder: Polyphaga
- Infraorder: Cucujiformia
- Family: Cerambycidae
- Genus: Cristocentrus
- Species: C. lebisi

Binomial name
- Cristocentrus lebisi Breuning, 1957

Genus of beetles

Cristocentrus lebisi is a species of beetle in the family Cerambycidae, and the only species in the genus Cristocentrus. It was described by Breuning in 1957.
