= Xylergatoides =

Xylergatoides asper

Scientific classification
- Kingdom: Animalia
- Phylum: Arthropoda
- Clade: Pancrustacea
- Class: Insecta
- Order: Coleoptera
- Suborder: Polyphaga
- Infraorder: Cucujiformia
- Family: Cerambycidae
- Genus: Xylergatoides
- Species: X. asper

Binomial name
- Xylergatoides asper Peringuey, 1896

Genus of beetles

Xylergatoides asper is a special species of beetle in the family Cerambycidae, the only species in the genus Xylergatoides.
