= Olenosus =

Olenosus serrimanus

Scientific classification
- Kingdom: Animalia
- Phylum: Arthropoda
- Class: Insecta
- Order: Coleoptera
- Suborder: Polyphaga
- Infraorder: Cucujiformia
- Family: Cerambycidae
- Genus: Olenosus
- Species: O. serrimanus

Binomial name
- Olenosus serrimanus Bates, 1872

Genus of beetles

Olenosus serrimanus is a species of beetle in the family Cerambycidae, the only species in the genus Olenosus.
