= Ameipsis =

Scientific classification
- Kingdom: Animalia
- Phylum: Arthropoda
- Class: Insecta
- Order: Coleoptera
- Suborder: Polyphaga
- Infraorder: Cucujiformia
- Family: Cerambycidae
- Genus: Ameipsis
- Species: A. marginicollis

Binomial name
- Ameipsis marginicollis Pascoe, 1865

Genus of beetles

Ameipsis is a genus of beetles in the family Cerambycidae, containing a single species, Ameipsis marginicollis. It was described by Pascoe in 1865.
