= Freoexocentrus =

Scientific classification
- Kingdom: Animalia
- Phylum: Arthropoda
- Class: Insecta
- Order: Coleoptera
- Suborder: Polyphaga
- Infraorder: Cucujiformia
- Family: Cerambycidae
- Genus: Freoexocentrus
- Species: F. mirei

Binomial name
- Freoexocentrus mirei Breuning, 1977

Genus of beetles

Freoexocentrus mirei is a species of beetle in the family Cerambycidae, and the only species in the genus Freoexocentrus. It was described by Breuning in 1977.
