= Cometochus =

Cometochus guadeloupensis

Scientific classification
- Kingdom: Animalia
- Phylum: Arthropoda
- Class: Insecta
- Order: Coleoptera
- Suborder: Polyphaga
- Infraorder: Cucujiformia
- Family: Cerambycidae
- Genus: Cometochus
- Species: C. guadeloupensis

Binomial name
- Cometochus guadeloupensis Villiers, 1980

Species of beetles

Cometochus guadeloupensis is a species of beetle in the family Cerambycidae, the only species in the genus Cometochus.
