= Nyssosternus =

Nyssosternus duidaensis

Scientific classification
- Kingdom: Animalia
- Phylum: Arthropoda
- Class: Insecta
- Order: Coleoptera
- Suborder: Polyphaga
- Infraorder: Cucujiformia
- Family: Cerambycidae
- Genus: Nyssosternus
- Species: N. duidaensis

Binomial name
- Nyssosternus duidaensis Gilmour, 1963

Genus of beetles

Nyssosternus duidaensis is a species of beetle in the family Cerambycidae, the only species in the genus Nyssosternus.
