= Paracanthocinus =

Scientific classification
- Kingdom: Animalia
- Phylum: Arthropoda
- Class: Insecta
- Order: Coleoptera
- Suborder: Polyphaga
- Infraorder: Cucujiformia
- Family: Cerambycidae
- Genus: Paracanthocinus
- Species: P. laosensis

Binomial name
- Paracanthocinus laosensis Breuning, 1965

Genus of beetles

Paracanthocinus laosensis is a species of beetle in the family Cerambycidae, and the only species in the genus Paracanthocinus. It was described by Stephan von Breuning in 1965.
