= Euryxaenapta =

Scientific classification
- Kingdom: Animalia
- Phylum: Arthropoda
- Class: Insecta
- Order: Coleoptera
- Suborder: Polyphaga
- Infraorder: Cucujiformia
- Family: Cerambycidae
- Genus: Euryxaenapta
- Species: E. rondoni

Binomial name
- Euryxaenapta rondoni Breuning, 1963

Genus of beetles

Euryxaenapta rondoni is a species of beetle in the family Cerambycidae, and the only species in the genus Euryxaenapta. It was described by Breuning in 1963.
