= Paraegocidnus =

Scientific classification
- Kingdom: Animalia
- Phylum: Arthropoda
- Class: Insecta
- Order: Coleoptera
- Suborder: Polyphaga
- Infraorder: Cucujiformia
- Family: Cerambycidae
- Genus: Paraegocidnus
- Species: P. feai

Binomial name
- Paraegocidnus feai Breuning, 1956

Genus of beetles

Paraegocidnus feai is a species of beetle in the family Cerambycidae, and the only species in the genus Paraegocidnus. It was described by Breuning in 1956.
