= Mimotrypanius =

Scientific classification
- Kingdom: Animalia
- Phylum: Arthropoda
- Class: Insecta
- Order: Coleoptera
- Suborder: Polyphaga
- Infraorder: Cucujiformia
- Family: Cerambycidae
- Genus: Mimotrypanius
- Species: M. samoanus

Binomial name
- Mimotrypanius samoanus Breuning, 1973

Genus of beetles

Mimotrypanius samoanus is a species of beetle in the family Cerambycidae, and the only species in the genus Mimotrypanius. It was described by Breuning in 1973.
