= Xenostylus =

Xenostylus sublineatus

Scientific classification
- Kingdom: Animalia
- Phylum: Arthropoda
- Class: Insecta
- Order: Coleoptera
- Suborder: Polyphaga
- Infraorder: Cucujiformia
- Family: Cerambycidae
- Genus: Xenostylus
- Species: X. sublineatus

Binomial name
- Xenostylus sublineatus Bates, 1885

Genus of beetles

Xenostylus sublineatus is a species of beetle in the family Cerambycidae, the only species in the genus Xenostylus.
