= Contoderus =

Scientific classification
- Kingdom: Animalia
- Phylum: Arthropoda
- Class: Insecta
- Order: Coleoptera
- Suborder: Polyphaga
- Infraorder: Cucujiformia
- Family: Cerambycidae
- Genus: Contoderus
- Species: C. hamaticollis

Binomial name
- Contoderus hamaticollis (Pascoe, 1859)

Genus of beetles

Contoderus hamaticollis is a species of beetle in the family Cerambycidae, and the only species in the genus Contoderus. It was described by Pascoe in 1859.
