= Bulbolmotega =

Scientific classification
- Kingdom: Animalia
- Phylum: Arthropoda
- Class: Insecta
- Order: Coleoptera
- Suborder: Polyphaga
- Infraorder: Cucujiformia
- Family: Cerambycidae
- Genus: Bulbolmotega; Breuning, 1966
- Species: B. sumatrensis

Binomial name
- Bulbolmotega sumatrensis Breuning, 1966

Genus of beetles

Bulbolmotega sumatrensis is a species of beetle in the family Cerambycidae, and the only species in the genus Bulbolmotega. It was described by Breuning in 1966.
