= Proxatrypanius =

Proxatrypanius rockefelleri

Scientific classification
- Kingdom: Animalia
- Phylum: Arthropoda
- Class: Insecta
- Order: Coleoptera
- Suborder: Polyphaga
- Infraorder: Cucujiformia
- Family: Cerambycidae
- Genus: Proxatrypanius
- Species: P. rockefelleri

Binomial name
- Proxatrypanius rockefelleri Gilmour, 1959

Genus of beetles

Proxatrypanius rockefelleri is a species of beetle in the family Cerambycidae, the only species in the genus Proxatrypanius.
