= Kallyntrosternidius =

Scientific classification
- Kingdom: Animalia
- Phylum: Arthropoda
- Class: Insecta
- Order: Coleoptera
- Suborder: Polyphaga
- Infraorder: Cucujiformia
- Family: Cerambycidae
- Genus: Kallyntrosternidius
- Species: K. bucarensis

Binomial name
- Kallyntrosternidius bucarensis Vitali, 2009

Genus of beetles

Kallyntrosternidius bucarensis is a species of beetle in the family Cerambycidae, the only species in the genus Kallyntrosternidius.
