= Ophthalmemeopedus =

Scientific classification
- Kingdom: Animalia
- Phylum: Arthropoda
- Class: Insecta
- Order: Coleoptera
- Suborder: Polyphaga
- Infraorder: Cucujiformia
- Family: Cerambycidae
- Genus: Ophthalmemeopedus
- Species: O. macrophthalmus

Binomial name
- Ophthalmemeopedus macrophthalmus Breuning, 1961

Genus of beetles

Ophthalmemeopedus macrophthalmus is a species of beetle in the family Cerambycidae, and the only species in the genus Ophthalmemeopedus. It was described by Stephan von Breuning in 1961.
