= Mimhoplomelas =

Scientific classification
- Kingdom: Animalia
- Phylum: Arthropoda
- Class: Insecta
- Order: Coleoptera
- Suborder: Polyphaga
- Infraorder: Cucujiformia
- Family: Cerambycidae
- Genus: Mimhoplomelas
- Species: M. diadelioides

Binomial name
- Mimhoplomelas diadelioides Breuning, 1970

Genus of beetles

Mimhoplomelas diadelioides is a species of beetle in the family Cerambycidae, and the only species in the genus Mimhoplomelas. It was described by Breuning in 1970.
