= Paratenthras =

Paratenthras martinsi

Scientific classification
- Kingdom: Animalia
- Phylum: Arthropoda
- Class: Insecta
- Order: Coleoptera
- Suborder: Polyphaga
- Infraorder: Cucujiformia
- Family: Cerambycidae
- Genus: Paratenthras
- Species: P. martinsi

Binomial name
- Paratenthras martinsi Monné, 1998

Genus of beetles

Paratenthras martinsi is a species of beetle in the family Cerambycidae, the only species in the genus Paratenthras.
