= Paraleiopus =

Paraleiopus Temporal range: 0.000069–0 Ma

Scientific classification
- Kingdom: Animalia
- Phylum: Arthropoda
- Class: Insecta
- Order: Coleoptera
- Suborder: Polyphaga
- Infraorder: Cucujiformia
- Family: Cerambycidae
- Genus: Paraleiopus
- Species: P. sumatranus

Binomial name
- Paraleiopus sumatranus Breuning, 1956

Genus of beetles

Paraleiopus sumatranus is a species of beetle in the family Cerambycidae, and the only species in the genus Paraleiopus. It was described by Breuning in 1956.
