= Anisopodesthes =

Anisopodesthes zikani

Scientific classification
- Kingdom: Animalia
- Phylum: Arthropoda
- Clade: Pancrustacea
- Class: Insecta
- Order: Coleoptera
- Suborder: Polyphaga
- Infraorder: Cucujiformia
- Family: Cerambycidae
- Genus: Anisopodesthes
- Species: A. zikani

Binomial name
- Anisopodesthes zikani Melzer, 1931

Genus of beetles

Anisopodesthes zikani is a species of beetle in the family Cerambycidae, the only species in the genus Anisopodesthes.
