= Bourbonia =

Scientific classification
- Kingdom: Animalia
- Phylum: Arthropoda
- Class: Insecta
- Order: Coleoptera
- Suborder: Polyphaga
- Infraorder: Cucujiformia
- Family: Cerambycidae
- Genus: Bourbonia
- Species: B. bifasciata

Binomial name
- Bourbonia bifasciata Jordan, 1894

Species of beetle

Bourbonia bifasciata is a species of beetle in the family Cerambycidae, and the only species in the genus Bourbonia. It was described by Karl Jordan in 1894.
