= Beloesthes =

Beloesthes megabasoides

Scientific classification
- Kingdom: Animalia
- Phylum: Arthropoda
- Class: Insecta
- Order: Coleoptera
- Suborder: Polyphaga
- Infraorder: Cucujiformia
- Family: Cerambycidae
- Genus: Beloesthes
- Species: B. megabasoides

Binomial name
- Beloesthes megabasoides Thomson, 1864

Genus of beetles

Beloesthes megabasoides is a species of beetle in the family Cerambycidae, the only species in the genus Beloesthes.
