= Valenus =

Scientific classification
- Kingdom: Animalia
- Phylum: Arthropoda
- Class: Insecta
- Order: Coleoptera
- Suborder: Polyphaga
- Infraorder: Cucujiformia
- Family: Cerambycidae
- Genus: Valenus
- Species: V. inornatus

Binomial name
- Valenus inornatus Casey, 1892

Genus of beetles

Valenus inornatus is a species of longhorn beetles of the subfamily Lamiinae, and the only species in the genus Valenus. It was described by Casey in 1892.
