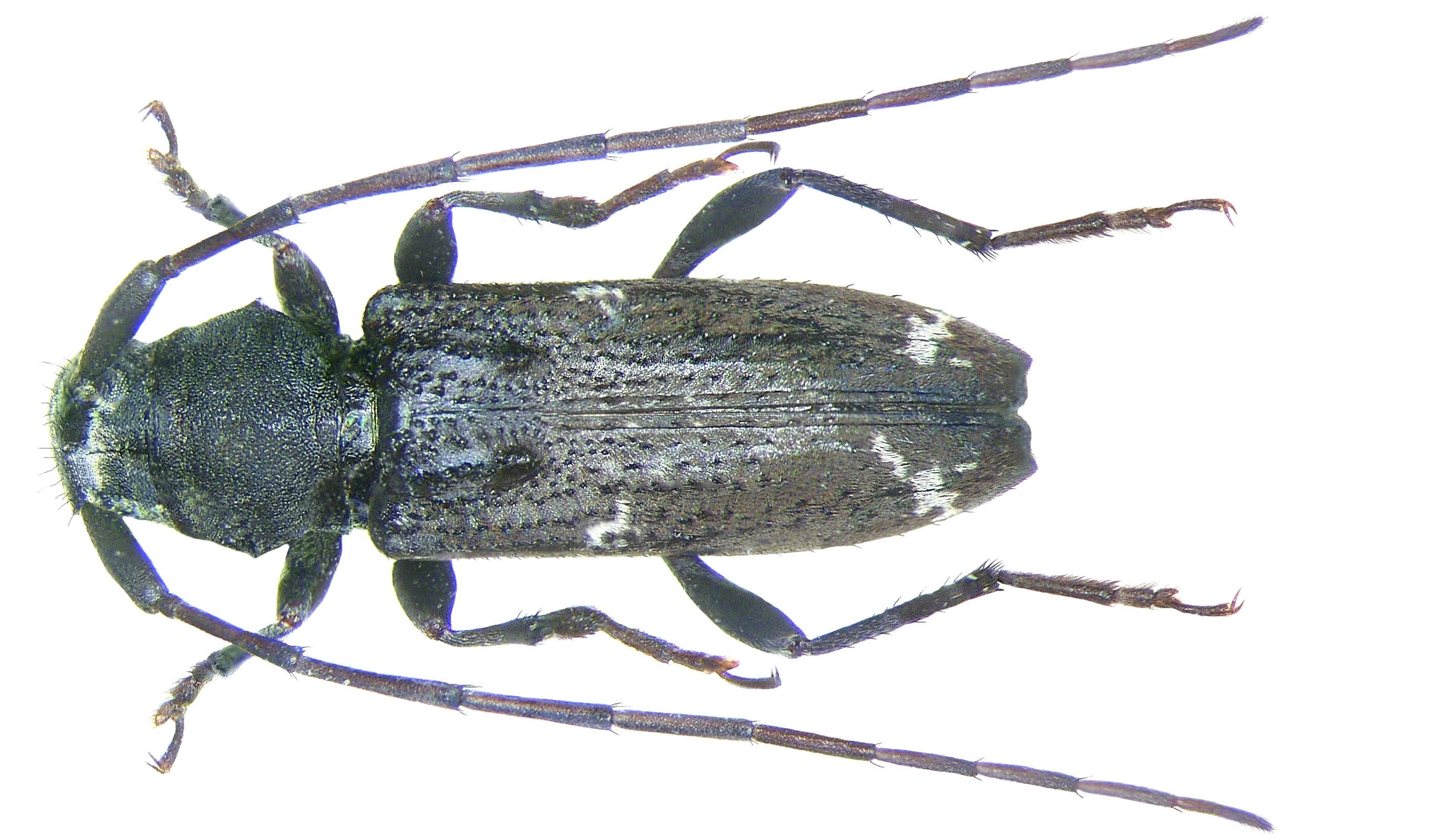

Scientific classification
- Kingdom: Animalia
- Phylum: Arthropoda
- Class: Insecta
- Order: Coleoptera
- Suborder: Polyphaga
- Infraorder: Cucujiformia
- Family: Cerambycidae
- Genus: Cristenes
- Species: C. cristatus

Binomial name
- Cristenes cristatus (Pic, 1928)

= Cristenes =

Genus of beetles

Cristenes cristatus is a species of beetle in the family Cerambycidae, and the only species in the genus Cristenes. It was described by Maurice Pic in 1928.
