= Parancylistes =

Scientific classification
- Kingdom: Animalia
- Phylum: Arthropoda
- Class: Insecta
- Order: Coleoptera
- Suborder: Polyphaga
- Infraorder: Cucujiformia
- Family: Cerambycidae
- Genus: Parancylistes
- Species: P. pictus

Binomial name
- Parancylistes pictus Breuning, 1957

Genus of beetles

Parancylistes pictus is a species of beetle in the family Cerambycidae, and the only species in the genus Parancylistes. It was described by Breuning in 1957.
