= Parahiekeia =

Scientific classification
- Kingdom: Animalia
- Phylum: Arthropoda
- Class: Insecta
- Order: Coleoptera
- Suborder: Polyphaga
- Infraorder: Cucujiformia
- Family: Cerambycidae
- Genus: Parahiekeia
- Species: P. hebridarum

Binomial name
- Parahiekeia hebridarum Breuning, 1977

Genus of beetles

Parahiekeia hebridarum is a species of beetle in the family Cerambycidae, and the only species in the genus Parahiekeia. It was described by Breuning in 1977.
