= Microhoplomelas =

Scientific classification
- Kingdom: Animalia
- Phylum: Arthropoda
- Class: Insecta
- Order: Coleoptera
- Suborder: Polyphaga
- Infraorder: Cucujiformia
- Family: Cerambycidae
- Genus: Microhoplomelas
- Species: M. ruficornis

Binomial name
- Microhoplomelas ruficornis (Fairmaire, 1896)

Genus of beetles

Microhoplomelas ruficornis is a species of beetle in the family Cerambycidae, and the only species in the genus Microhoplomelas. It was described by Fairmaire in 1896.
