= Emeopedopsis =

Scientific classification
- Kingdom: Animalia
- Phylum: Arthropoda
- Class: Insecta
- Order: Coleoptera
- Suborder: Polyphaga
- Infraorder: Cucujiformia
- Family: Cerambycidae
- Genus: Emeopedopsis
- Species: E. laosensis

Binomial name
- Emeopedopsis laosensis Breuning, 1965

Genus of beetles

Emeopedopsis laosensis is a species of beetle in the family Cerambycidae, and the only species in the genus Emeopedopsis. It was described by Breuning in 1965.
