= Metadriopea =

Scientific classification
- Kingdom: Animalia
- Phylum: Arthropoda
- Class: Insecta
- Order: Coleoptera
- Suborder: Polyphaga
- Infraorder: Cucujiformia
- Family: Cerambycidae
- Genus: Metadriopea
- Species: M. albomaculata

Binomial name
- Metadriopea albomaculata Breuning, 1977

Genus of beetles

Metadriopea albomaculata is a species of beetle in the family Cerambycidae, and the only species in the genus Metadriopea. It was described by Breuning in 1977.
