= Cristurges =

Cristurges bimaculatus

Scientific classification
- Kingdom: Animalia
- Phylum: Arthropoda
- Class: Insecta
- Order: Coleoptera
- Suborder: Polyphaga
- Infraorder: Cucujiformia
- Family: Cerambycidae
- Genus: Cristurges
- Species: C. bimaculatus

Binomial name
- Cristurges bimaculatus Gilmour, 1961

Genus of beetles

Cristurges bimaculatus is a species of beetle in the family Cerambycidae, the only species in the genus Cristurges.
