= Antecrurisa =

Antecrurisa apicalis

Scientific classification
- Kingdom: Animalia
- Phylum: Arthropoda
- Class: Insecta
- Order: Coleoptera
- Suborder: Polyphaga
- Infraorder: Cucujiformia
- Family: Cerambycidae
- Genus: Antecrurisa
- Species: A. apicalis

Binomial name
- Antecrurisa apicalis (Bates, 1864)

Genus of beetles

Antecrurisa apicalis is a species of beetle in the family Cerambycidae, the only species in the genus Antecrurisa.
