= Tuberastyochus =

Tuberastyochus tenebrosus

Scientific classification
- Kingdom: Animalia
- Phylum: Arthropoda
- Class: Insecta
- Order: Coleoptera
- Suborder: Polyphaga
- Infraorder: Cucujiformia
- Family: Cerambycidae
- Genus: Tuberastyochus
- Species: T. tenebrosus

Binomial name
- Tuberastyochus tenebrosus Bates, 1881

Genus of beetles

Tuberastyochus tenebrosus is a species of beetle in the family Cerambycidae, the only species in the genus Tuberastyochus.
