= Phrissolaus =

Phrissolaus inspersus

Scientific classification
- Kingdom: Animalia
- Phylum: Arthropoda
- Class: Insecta
- Order: Coleoptera
- Suborder: Polyphaga
- Infraorder: Cucujiformia
- Family: Cerambycidae
- Genus: Phrissolaus
- Species: P. inspersus

Binomial name
- Phrissolaus inspersus Bates, 1881

Genus of beetles

Phrissolaus inspersus is a species of beetle in the family Cerambycidae, the only species in the genus Phrissolaus.
