= Clavemeopedus =

Scientific classification
- Kingdom: Animalia
- Phylum: Arthropoda
- Class: Insecta
- Order: Coleoptera
- Suborder: Polyphaga
- Infraorder: Cucujiformia
- Family: Cerambycidae
- Genus: Clavemeopedus
- Species: C. aureosignatus

Binomial name
- Clavemeopedus aureosignatus Breuning, 1969

Genus of beetles

Clavemeopedus aureosignatus is a species of beetle in the family Cerambycidae, and the only species in the genus Clavemeopedus. It was described by Breuning in 1969.
