= Parabaryssinus =

Parabaryssinus lineaticollis

Scientific classification
- Kingdom: Animalia
- Phylum: Arthropoda
- Class: Insecta
- Order: Coleoptera
- Suborder: Polyphaga
- Infraorder: Cucujiformia
- Family: Cerambycidae
- Genus: Parabaryssinus
- Species: P. lineaticollis

Binomial name
- Parabaryssinus lineaticollis Peringuey, 1896

Genus of beetles

Parabaryssinus lineaticollis is a species of beetle in the family Cerambycidae, the only species in the genus Parabaryssinus.
