= Euryclytosemia =

Scientific classification
- Kingdom: Animalia
- Phylum: Arthropoda
- Class: Insecta
- Order: Coleoptera
- Suborder: Polyphaga
- Infraorder: Cucujiformia
- Family: Cerambycidae
- Genus: Euryclytosemia
- Species: E. nomurai

Binomial name
- Euryclytosemia nomurai Hayashi, 1963

Genus of beetles

Euryclytosemia is a monotypic genus of beetles in the family Cerambycidae. The sole species is Euryclytosemia nomurai. Both the genus and the species were described by Masao Hayashi in 1963. It is known from Yonaguni in the southern Ryukyu Islands, Japan, and from Green and Orchid Islands, Taiwan.

Euryclytosemia nomurai measure 4.5–6 mm (0.18–0.24 in).
