= Mimacanthocinus =

Scientific classification
- Kingdom: Animalia
- Phylum: Arthropoda
- Class: Insecta
- Order: Coleoptera
- Suborder: Polyphaga
- Infraorder: Cucujiformia
- Family: Cerambycidae
- Genus: Mimacanthocinus
- Species: M. tonkinensis

Binomial name
- Mimacanthocinus tonkinensis Breuning, 1958

Genus of beetles

Mimacanthocinus tonkinensis is a species of beetle in the family Cerambycidae, and the only species in the genus Mimacanthocinus. It was described by Breuning in 1958.
