= Carpheolus =

Scientific classification
- Kingdom: Animalia
- Phylum: Arthropoda
- Class: Insecta
- Order: Coleoptera
- Suborder: Polyphaga
- Infraorder: Cucujiformia
- Family: Cerambycidae
- Genus: Carpheolus
- Species: C. sublineatus

Binomial name
- Carpheolus sublineatus Bates, 1885

Genus of beetles

Carpheolus sublineatus is a species of beetle in the family Cerambycidae, the only species in the genus Carpheolus.
