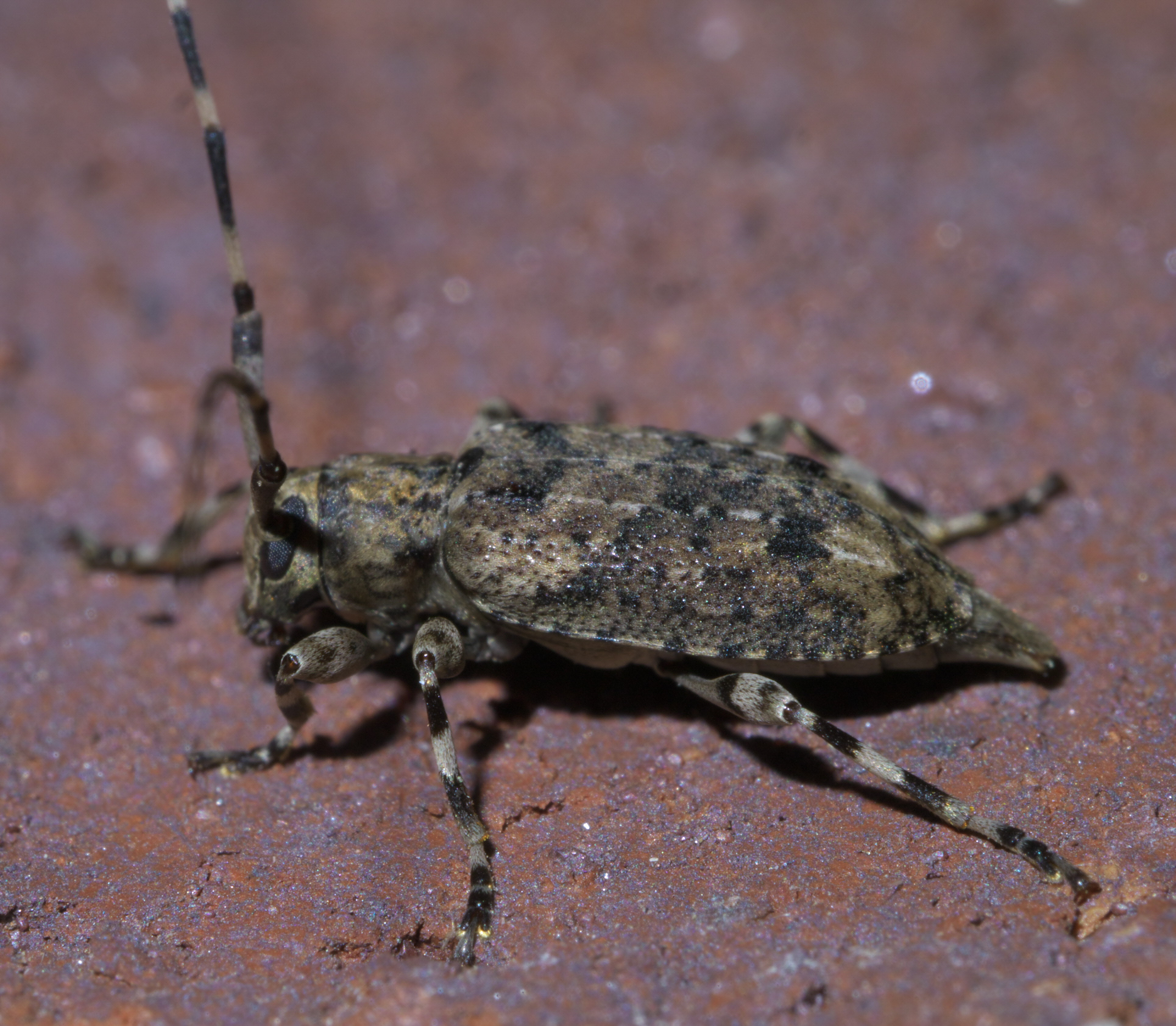

Scientific classification
- Domain: Eukaryota
- Kingdom: Animalia
- Phylum: Arthropoda
- Class: Insecta
- Order: Coleoptera
- Suborder: Polyphaga
- Infraorder: Cucujiformia
- Family: Cerambycidae
- Genus: Astyleiopus
- Species: A. variegatus

Binomial name
- Astyleiopus variegatus (Haldeman, 1847)

= Astyleiopus =

Genus of beetles

Astyleiopus is a genus of beetles in the family Cerambycidae. It is monotypic, being represented by the single species, Astyleiopus variegatus.
