= Chaetacosta =

Chaetacosta vittithorax

Scientific classification
- Kingdom: Animalia
- Phylum: Arthropoda
- Class: Insecta
- Order: Coleoptera
- Suborder: Polyphaga
- Infraorder: Cucujiformia
- Family: Cerambycidae
- Genus: Chaetacosta
- Species: C. vittithorax

Binomial name
- Chaetacosta vittithorax Gilmour, 1961

Genus of beetles

Chaetacosta vittithorax is a species of beetle in the family Cerambycidae, the only species in the genus Chaetacosta.
