= Trypanidiellus =

Trypanidiellus decoratus

Scientific classification
- Kingdom: Animalia
- Phylum: Arthropoda
- Class: Insecta
- Order: Coleoptera
- Suborder: Polyphaga
- Infraorder: Cucujiformia
- Family: Cerambycidae
- Genus: Trypanidiellus
- Species: T. decoratus

Binomial name
- Trypanidiellus decoratus Monné & Delfino, 1980

Genus of beetles

Trypanidiellus decoratus is a species of beetle in the family Cerambycidae, the only species in the genus Trypanidiellus.
