= Paraprobatius =

Paraprobatius bucki

Scientific classification
- Kingdom: Animalia
- Phylum: Arthropoda
- Class: Insecta
- Order: Coleoptera
- Suborder: Polyphaga
- Infraorder: Cucujiformia
- Family: Cerambycidae
- Genus: Paraprobatius
- Species: P. bucki

Binomial name
- Paraprobatius bucki Breuning, 1955

Genus of beetles

Paraprobatius bucki is a species of beetle in the family Cerambycidae, the only species in the genus Paraprobatius.
