= Mimozygoceropsis =

Scientific classification
- Kingdom: Animalia
- Phylum: Arthropoda
- Class: Insecta
- Order: Coleoptera
- Suborder: Polyphaga
- Infraorder: Cucujiformia
- Family: Cerambycidae
- Genus: Mimozygoceropsis
- Species: M. flavosignata

Binomial name
- Mimozygoceropsis flavosignata Breuning, 1978

Genus of beetles

Mimozygoceropsis flavosignata is a species of beetle in the family Cerambycidae, and the only species in the genus Mimozygoceropsis. It was described by Breuning in 1978.
