= Georgeanna =

Female given name

- Gender: Female

Origin
- Origin: English

Other names
- Related names: Georgina, Georgine

Georgeanna is an English female given name. It is a variant of Georgina, which in turn is the feminine form of George.

The name Georgeanna has never been particularly popular. The last time since the United States started keeping track of given names in 1880 that it was in the top 1000 most common names was in 1884, when it was the 883rd most common. The only time it was sub-1000 before was the year before, at #856. Variation Georgeann experienced a surge in popularity from 1941 to 1947. It peaked at the 847th most popular in 1942.

Notable people with the name include:

- Georgeanna Seegar Jones (1912–2005), American doctor who popularised in vitro fertilization
- Georgeanna Tillman (1943–1980), American R&B and soul singer who was an original member of the Motown girl group The Marvelettes
- Georgann Hawkins (d. 1974), American college student at the University of Washington who was murdered by Ted Bundy
- Georgeann Wells, American college basketball player who played at West Virginia University
- Georgeanna Woolsey (1833–1906), American author and nurse
