= Mimohoplorana =

Scientific classification
- Kingdom: Animalia
- Phylum: Arthropoda
- Class: Insecta
- Order: Coleoptera
- Suborder: Polyphaga
- Infraorder: Cucujiformia
- Family: Cerambycidae
- Genus: Mimohoplorana
- Species: M. puncticollis

Binomial name
- Mimohoplorana puncticollis Breuning, 1960

Genus of beetles

Mimohoplorana puncticollis is a species of beetle in the family Cerambycidae, and the only species in the genus Mimohoplorana. It was described by Breuning in 1960.
