= Mimocoedomea =

Scientific classification
- Kingdom: Animalia
- Phylum: Arthropoda
- Class: Insecta
- Order: Coleoptera
- Suborder: Polyphaga
- Infraorder: Cucujiformia
- Family: Cerambycidae
- Genus: Mimocoedomea
- Species: M. fusca

Binomial name
- Mimocoedomea fusca Breuning, 1940

Genus of beetles

Mimocoedomea fusca is a species of beetle in the family Cerambycidae, and the only species in the genus Mimocoedomea. It was described by Breuning in 1940.
