= Calolamia =

Scientific classification
- Kingdom: Animalia
- Phylum: Arthropoda
- Class: Insecta
- Order: Coleoptera
- Suborder: Polyphaga
- Infraorder: Cucujiformia
- Family: Cerambycidae
- Genus: Calolamia
- Species: C. bicordifera

Binomial name
- Calolamia bicordifera Tippmann, 1953

Genus of beetles

Calolamia bicordifera is a species of beetle in the family Cerambycidae, the only species in the genus Calolamia.
