= Fisherostylus =

Fisherostylus bruneri

Scientific classification
- Kingdom: Animalia
- Phylum: Arthropoda
- Class: Insecta
- Order: Coleoptera
- Suborder: Polyphaga
- Infraorder: Cucujiformia
- Family: Cerambycidae
- Genus: Fisherostylus
- Species: F. bruneri

Binomial name
- Fisherostylus bruneri (Fisher, 1926)

Genus of beetles

Fisherostylus bruneri is a species of beetle in the family Cerambycidae, the only species in the genus Fisherostylus.
