= Leptrichillus =

Leptrichillus minutus

Scientific classification
- Kingdom: Animalia
- Phylum: Arthropoda
- Class: Insecta
- Order: Coleoptera
- Suborder: Polyphaga
- Infraorder: Cucujiformia
- Family: Cerambycidae
- Genus: Leptrichillus
- Species: L. minutus

Binomial name
- Leptrichillus minutus Gilmour, 1960

Genus of beetles

Leptrichillus minutus is a species of beetle in the family Cerambycidae, the only species in the genus Leptrichillus.
