= Nanustes =

Nanustes fuchsi

Scientific classification
- Kingdom: Animalia
- Phylum: Arthropoda
- Class: Insecta
- Order: Coleoptera
- Suborder: Polyphaga
- Infraorder: Cucujiformia
- Family: Cerambycidae
- Genus: Nanustes
- Species: N. fuchsi

Binomial name
- Nanustes fuchsi Gilmour, 1960

Genus of beetles

Nanustes fuchsi is a species of beetle in the family Cerambycidae, the only species in the genus Nanustes.
