= Paracristenes =

Scientific classification
- Kingdom: Animalia
- Phylum: Arthropoda
- Class: Insecta
- Order: Coleoptera
- Suborder: Polyphaga
- Infraorder: Cucujiformia
- Family: Cerambycidae
- Genus: Paracristenes
- Species: P. fergussoni

Binomial name
- Paracristenes fergussoni Breuning, 1970

Genus of beetles

Paracristenes fergussoni is a species of beetle in the family Cerambycidae, and the only species in the genus Paracristenes. It was described by Breuning in 1970.
