= Boninoleiops =

Scientific classification
- Kingdom: Animalia
- Phylum: Arthropoda
- Class: Insecta
- Order: Coleoptera
- Suborder: Polyphaga
- Infraorder: Cucujiformia
- Family: Cerambycidae
- Genus: Boninoleiops
- Species: B. kitajimai

Binomial name
- Boninoleiops kitajimai Hasegawa & Makihara, 2001

Genus of beetles

Boninoleiops kitajimai is a species of beetle in the family Cerambycidae, and the only species in the genus Boninoleiops. It was described by Hasegawa and Makihara in 2001.
