= Fasciculancylistes =

Scientific classification
- Kingdom: Animalia
- Phylum: Arthropoda
- Class: Insecta
- Order: Coleoptera
- Suborder: Polyphaga
- Infraorder: Cucujiformia
- Family: Cerambycidae
- Genus: Fasciculancylistes
- Species: F. fasciculatus

Binomial name
- Fasciculancylistes fasciculatus Breuning, 1965

Genus of beetles

Fasciculancylistes fasciculatus is a species of beetle in the family Cerambycidae, and the only species in the genus Fasciculancylistes. It was described by Breuning in 1965.
