= Trichalcidion =

Trichalcidion penicillum

Scientific classification
- Kingdom: Animalia
- Phylum: Arthropoda
- Class: Insecta
- Order: Coleoptera
- Suborder: Polyphaga
- Infraorder: Cucujiformia
- Family: Cerambycidae
- Genus: Trichalcidion
- Species: T. penicillum

Binomial name
- Trichalcidion penicillum Monné & Delfino, 1981

Genus of beetles

Trichalcidion penicillum is a species of beetle in the family Cerambycidae, the only species in the genus Trichalcidion.
