= Catharesthes =

Scientific classification
- Kingdom: Animalia
- Phylum: Arthropoda
- Class: Insecta
- Order: Coleoptera
- Suborder: Polyphaga
- Infraorder: Cucujiformia
- Family: Cerambycidae
- Genus: Catharesthes
- Species: C. elegans

Binomial name
- Catharesthes elegans Bates, 1881

Genus of beetles

Catharesthes elegans is a species of longhorn beetles (insects in the family Cerambycidae); It is the only species in the genus Catharesthes.
