= Sciadosoma =

Sciadosoma umbrosum

Scientific classification
- Kingdom: Animalia
- Phylum: Arthropoda
- Clade: Pancrustacea
- Class: Insecta
- Order: Coleoptera
- Suborder: Polyphaga
- Infraorder: Cucujiformia
- Family: Cerambycidae
- Genus: Sciadosoma
- Species: S. umbrosum

Binomial name
- Sciadosoma umbrosum Melzer, 1934

Genus of beetles

Sciadosoma umbrosum is a species of beetle in the family Cerambycidae, the only species in the genus Sciadosoma.
