= Paratrichonius =

Paratrichonius caesius

Scientific classification
- Kingdom: Animalia
- Phylum: Arthropoda
- Class: Insecta
- Order: Coleoptera
- Suborder: Polyphaga
- Infraorder: Cucujiformia
- Family: Cerambycidae
- Genus: Paratrichonius
- Species: P. caesius

Binomial name
- Paratrichonius caesius Monne & Monne, 2011

Genus of beetles

Paratrichonius caesius is a species of beetle in the family Cerambycidae, the only species in the genus Paratrichonius.
