= Alloeomorphus =

Alloeomorphus formosus

Scientific classification
- Domain: Eukaryota
- Kingdom: Animalia
- Phylum: Arthropoda
- Class: Insecta
- Order: Coleoptera
- Suborder: Polyphaga
- Infraorder: Cucujiformia
- Family: Cerambycidae
- Tribe: Hemilophini
- Genus: Alloeomorphus
- Species: A. formosus

Binomial name
- Alloeomorphus formosus Monne & Monne, 2011

Genus of beetles

Alloeomorphus formosus is a species of beetle in the family Cerambycidae, the only species in the genus Alloeomorphus.
