= Mimaderpas =

Scientific classification
- Kingdom: Animalia
- Phylum: Arthropoda
- Class: Insecta
- Order: Coleoptera
- Suborder: Polyphaga
- Infraorder: Cucujiformia
- Family: Cerambycidae
- Genus: Mimaderpas
- Species: M. anteaureus

Binomial name
- Mimaderpas anteaureus Breuning, 1973

Genus of beetles

Mimaderpas anteaureus is a species of beetle in the family Cerambycidae, and the only species in the genus Mimaderpas. It was described by Breuning in 1973.
