= Trichalphus =

Trichalphus pilosus

Scientific classification
- Kingdom: Animalia
- Phylum: Arthropoda
- Class: Insecta
- Order: Coleoptera
- Suborder: Polyphaga
- Infraorder: Cucujiformia
- Family: Cerambycidae
- Genus: Trichalphus
- Species: T. pilosus

Binomial name
- Trichalphus pilosus Bates, 1881

Genus of beetles

Trichalphus pilosus is a species of beetle in the family Cerambycidae, the only species in the genus Trichalphus.
