= Hoploranomimus =

Scientific classification
- Kingdom: Animalia
- Phylum: Arthropoda
- Class: Insecta
- Order: Coleoptera
- Suborder: Polyphaga
- Infraorder: Cucujiformia
- Family: Cerambycidae
- Genus: Hoploranomimus
- Species: H. harmandi

Binomial name
- Hoploranomimus harmandi (Pic, 1939)

Genus of beetles

Hoploranomimus harmandi is a species of beetle in the family Cerambycidae, and the only species in the genus Hoploranomimus. It was described by Maurice Pic in 1939.
