= Idephrynus =

Scientific classification
- Kingdom: Animalia
- Phylum: Arthropoda
- Class: Insecta
- Order: Coleoptera
- Suborder: Polyphaga
- Infraorder: Cucujiformia
- Family: Cerambycidae
- Genus: Idephrynus
- Species: I. scaber

Binomial name
- Idephrynus scaber Bates, 1881

Genus of beetles

Idephrynus scaber is a species of beetle in the family Cerambycidae, the only species in the genus Idephrynus.
