= Hexacona =

Scientific classification
- Kingdom: Animalia
- Phylum: Arthropoda
- Class: Insecta
- Order: Coleoptera
- Suborder: Polyphaga
- Infraorder: Cucujiformia
- Family: Cerambycidae
- Genus: Hexacona
- Species: H. armata

Binomial name
- Hexacona armata Bates, 1881

Genus of beetles

Hexacona armata is a species of beetle in the family Cerambycidae, the only species in the genus Hexacona.
