= Amniscites =

Scientific classification
- Kingdom: Animalia
- Phylum: Arthropoda
- Class: Insecta
- Order: Coleoptera
- Suborder: Polyphaga
- Infraorder: Cucujiformia
- Family: Cerambycidae
- Genus: Amniscites
- Species: A. pictipes

Binomial name
- Amniscites pictipes (Bates, 1863)

Genus of beetles

Amniscites pictipes is a species of beetle in the family Cerambycidae, the only species in the genus Amniscites.
