= Falsexocentrus =

Scientific classification
- Kingdom: Animalia
- Phylum: Arthropoda
- Class: Insecta
- Order: Coleoptera
- Suborder: Polyphaga
- Infraorder: Cucujiformia
- Family: Cerambycidae
- Genus: Falsexocentrus
- Species: F. carinipennis

Binomial name
- Falsexocentrus carinipennis Breuning, 1970

Genus of beetles

Falsexocentrus carinipennis is a species of beetle in the family Cerambycidae, and the only species in the genus Falsexocentrus. It was described by Breuning in 1970.
