= Cristisse =

Scientific classification
- Kingdom: Animalia
- Phylum: Arthropoda
- Class: Insecta
- Order: Coleoptera
- Suborder: Polyphaga
- Infraorder: Cucujiformia
- Family: Cerambycidae
- Genus: Cristisse
- Species: C. bicristata

Binomial name
- Cristisse bicristata Breuning, 1955

Genus of beetles

Cristisse bicristata is a species of beetle in the family Cerambycidae, and the only species in the genus Cristisse. It was described by Breuning in 1955.
