= Tropidocoleus =

Tropidocoleus bicarinatus

Scientific classification
- Kingdom: Animalia
- Phylum: Arthropoda
- Class: Insecta
- Order: Coleoptera
- Suborder: Polyphaga
- Infraorder: Cucujiformia
- Family: Cerambycidae
- Genus: Tropidocoleus
- Species: T. bicarinatus

Binomial name
- Tropidocoleus bicarinatus Monne, 2009

Genus of beetles

Tropidocoleus bicarinatus is a species of beetle in the family Cerambycidae, the only species in the genus Tropidocoleus.
