= Lebisia =

Scientific classification
- Kingdom: Animalia
- Phylum: Arthropoda
- Class: Insecta
- Order: Coleoptera
- Suborder: Polyphaga
- Infraorder: Cucujiformia
- Family: Cerambycidae
- Genus: Lebisia
- Species: L. vadoni

Binomial name
- Lebisia vadoni Breuning, 1957

Genus of beetles

Lebisia vadoni is a species of beetle in the family Cerambycidae, and the only species in the genus Lebisia. It was described by Stephan von Breuning in 1957.
