= Proseriphus =

Proseriphus viridis

Scientific classification
- Kingdom: Animalia
- Phylum: Arthropoda
- Class: Insecta
- Order: Coleoptera
- Suborder: Polyphaga
- Infraorder: Cucujiformia
- Family: Cerambycidae
- Genus: Proseriphus
- Species: P. viridis

Binomial name
- Proseriphus viridis (Bates, 1864)

Genus of beetles

Proseriphus viridis is a species of beetle in the family Cerambycidae, the only species in the genus Proseriphus.
