= Mimancylistes =

Scientific classification
- Kingdom: Animalia
- Phylum: Arthropoda
- Class: Insecta
- Order: Coleoptera
- Suborder: Polyphaga
- Infraorder: Cucujiformia
- Family: Cerambycidae
- Genus: Mimancylistes
- Species: M. malaisei

Binomial name
- Mimancylistes malaisei Breuning, 1955

Genus of beetles

Mimancylistes malaisei is a species of beetle in the family Cerambycidae, and the only species in the genus Mimancylistes. It was described by Stephan von Breuning in 1955.
