= Intricatotrypanius =

Scientific classification
- Kingdom: Animalia
- Phylum: Arthropoda
- Class: Insecta
- Order: Coleoptera
- Suborder: Polyphaga
- Infraorder: Cucujiformia
- Family: Cerambycidae
- Genus: Intricatotrypanius
- Species: I. intricatus

Binomial name
- Intricatotrypanius intricatus (Gressitt, 1956)

Genus of beetles

Intricatotrypanius intricatus is a species of beetle in the family Cerambycidae, and the only species in the genus Intricatotrypanius. It was described by Gressitt in 1956.
