= Pertyia =

Pertyia sericea

Scientific classification
- Kingdom: Animalia
- Phylum: Arthropoda
- Class: Insecta
- Order: Coleoptera
- Suborder: Polyphaga
- Infraorder: Cucujiformia
- Family: Cerambycidae
- Genus: Pertyia
- Species: P. sericea

Binomial name
- Pertyia sericea (Perty, 1832)

Genus of beetles

Pertyia sericea is a species of beetle in the family Cerambycidae, the only species in the genus Pertyia.
