= Antilleptostylus =

Scientific classification
- Kingdom: Animalia
- Phylum: Arthropoda
- Class: Insecta
- Order: Coleoptera
- Suborder: Polyphaga
- Infraorder: Cucujiformia
- Family: Cerambycidae
- Genus: Antilleptostylus
- Species: A. nigricans

Binomial name
- Antilleptostylus nigricans (Fisher, 1935)

Genus of beetles

Antilleptostylus nigricans is a species of longhorn beetles of the subfamily Lamiinae, and the only species in the genus Antilleptostylus. It was described by Fisher in 1935.
