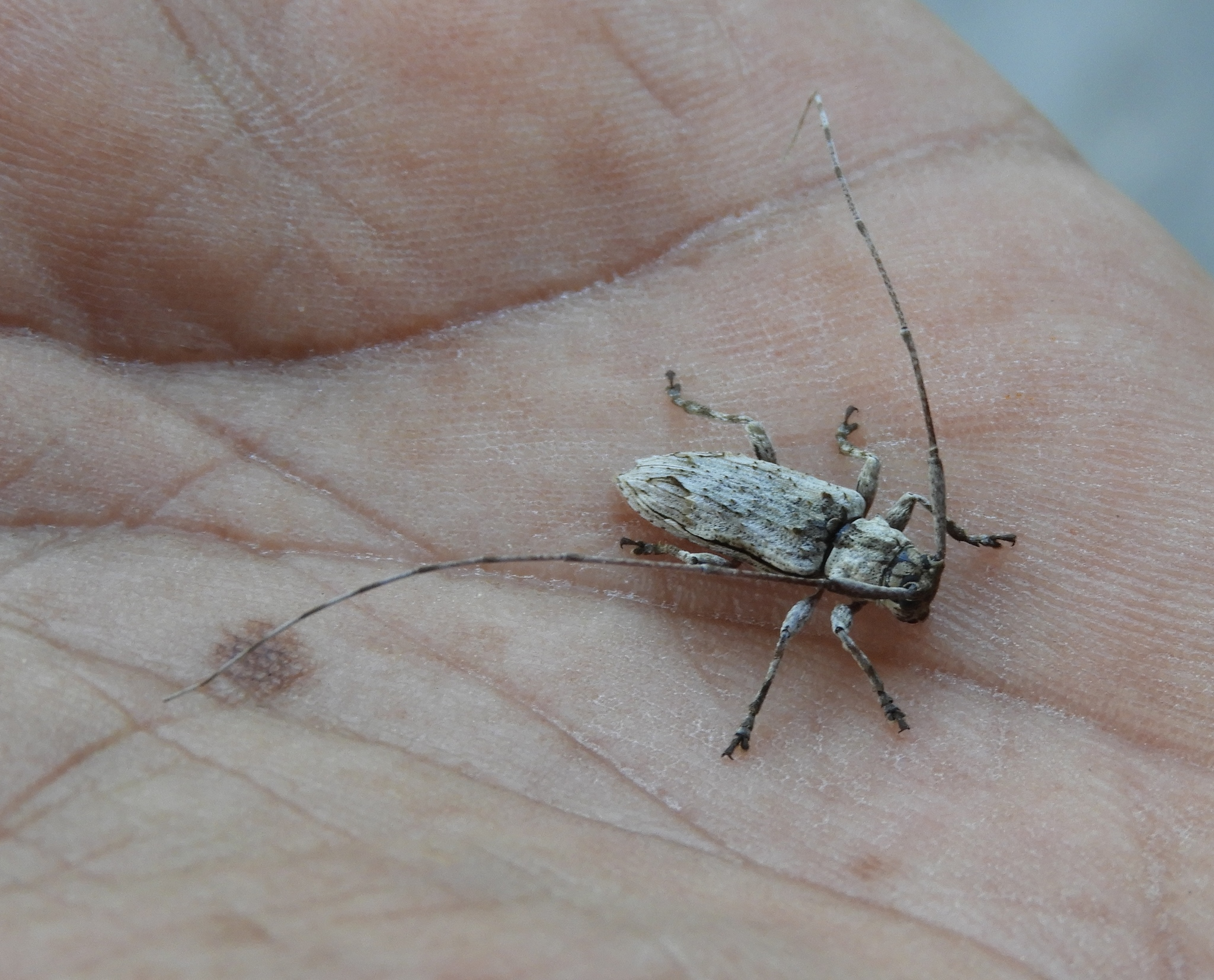

Scientific classification
- Kingdom: Animalia
- Phylum: Arthropoda
- Class: Insecta
- Order: Coleoptera
- Suborder: Polyphaga
- Infraorder: Cucujiformia
- Family: Cerambycidae
- Genus: Mecotetartus
- Species: M. antennatus

Binomial name
- Mecotetartus antennatus Bates, 1872

= Mecotetartus =

Mecotetartus antennatus

Genus of beetles

Mecotetartus antennatus is a species of beetle in the family Cerambycidae, the only species in the genus Mecotetartus.
