= Apteralcidion =

Apteralcidion lapierrei

Scientific classification
- Kingdom: Animalia
- Phylum: Arthropoda
- Class: Insecta
- Order: Coleoptera
- Suborder: Polyphaga
- Infraorder: Cucujiformia
- Family: Cerambycidae
- Genus: Apteralcidion
- Species: A. lapierrei

Binomial name
- Apteralcidion lapierrei Hovore, 1992

Genus of beetles

Apteralcidion lapierrei is a species of beetle in the family Cerambycidae, the only species in the genus Apteralcidion.
