= Dryana =

Scientific classification
- Kingdom: Animalia
- Phylum: Arthropoda
- Class: Insecta
- Order: Coleoptera
- Suborder: Polyphaga
- Infraorder: Cucujiformia
- Family: Cerambycidae
- Genus: Dryana
- Species: D. bituberculata

Binomial name
- Dryana bituberculata Gistel & Bromme, 1848

Genus of beetles

Dryana is a monotypic genus in the family Cerambycidae described by Johannes von Nepomuk Franz Xaver Gistel and Traugott Bromme in 1848. Its only species, Dryana bituberculata, was described by the same authors in the same year.
