= Hiekeia =

Scientific classification
- Kingdom: Animalia
- Phylum: Arthropoda
- Class: Insecta
- Order: Coleoptera
- Suborder: Polyphaga
- Infraorder: Cucujiformia
- Family: Cerambycidae
- Genus: Hiekeia
- Species: H. pedunculata

Binomial name
- Hiekeia pedunculata Breuning, 1964

Genus of beetles

Hiekeia pedunculata is a species of beetle in the family Cerambycidae, and the only species in the genus Hiekeia. It was described by Breuning in 1964.
