= Paroectropsis =

Paroectropsis decoratus

Scientific classification
- Kingdom: Animalia
- Phylum: Arthropoda
- Class: Insecta
- Order: Coleoptera
- Suborder: Polyphaga
- Infraorder: Cucujiformia
- Family: Cerambycidae
- Genus: Paroectropsis
- Species: P. decoratus

Binomial name
- Paroectropsis decoratus Cerda, 1954

Genus of beetles

Paroectropsis decoratus is a species of beetle in the family Cerambycidae, the only species in the genus Paroectropsis.
