= Mimeryssamena =

Scientific classification
- Kingdom: Animalia
- Phylum: Arthropoda
- Class: Insecta
- Order: Coleoptera
- Suborder: Polyphaga
- Infraorder: Cucujiformia
- Family: Cerambycidae
- Genus: Mimeryssamena
- Species: M. besucheti

Binomial name
- Mimeryssamena besucheti Breuning, 1971

Genus of beetles

Mimeryssamena besucheti is a species of beetle in the family Cerambycidae, and the only species in the genus Mimeryssamena. It was described by Breuning in 1971.
