= Paralcidion =

Paralcidion bilineatum

Scientific classification
- Kingdom: Animalia
- Phylum: Arthropoda
- Class: Insecta
- Order: Coleoptera
- Suborder: Polyphaga
- Infraorder: Cucujiformia
- Family: Cerambycidae
- Genus: Paralcidion
- Species: P. bilineatum

Binomial name
- Paralcidion bilineatum Gilmour, 1957

Genus of beetles

Paralcidion bilineatum is a species of beetle in the family Cerambycidae, the only species in the genus Paralcidion.
