= Falsacanthocinus =

Scientific classification
- Domain: Eukaryota
- Kingdom: Animalia
- Phylum: Arthropoda
- Class: Insecta
- Order: Coleoptera
- Suborder: Polyphaga
- Infraorder: Cucujiformia
- Family: Cerambycidae
- Genus: Falsacanthocinus
- Species: F. brevis

Binomial name
- Falsacanthocinus brevis (Fauvel, 1906)

Genus of beetles

Falsacanthocinus brevis is a species of beetle in the family Cerambycidae, and the only species in the genus Falsacanthocinus. It was described by Fauvel in 1906.
