= Lithargyrus =

Lithargyrus melzeri

Scientific classification
- Kingdom: Animalia
- Phylum: Arthropoda
- Class: Insecta
- Order: Coleoptera
- Suborder: Polyphaga
- Infraorder: Cucujiformia
- Family: Cerambycidae
- Genus: Lithargyrus
- Species: L. melzeri

Binomial name
- Lithargyrus melzeri Martins & Monné, 1974

Genus of beetles

Lithargyrus melzeri is a species of beetle in the family Cerambycidae, the only species in the genus Lithargyrus.
