= Falsometopides =

Scientific classification
- Kingdom: Animalia
- Phylum: Arthropoda
- Class: Insecta
- Order: Coleoptera
- Suborder: Polyphaga
- Infraorder: Cucujiformia
- Family: Cerambycidae
- Genus: Falsometopides
- Species: F. fuscomaculatus

Binomial name
- Falsometopides fuscomaculatus Breuning, 1957

Genus of beetles

Falsometopides fuscomaculatus is a species of beetle in the family Cerambycidae, and the only species in the genus Falsometopides. It was described by Breuning in 1957.
