= Elongatocontoderus =

Scientific classification
- Kingdom: Animalia
- Phylum: Arthropoda
- Class: Insecta
- Order: Coleoptera
- Suborder: Polyphaga
- Infraorder: Cucujiformia
- Family: Cerambycidae
- Genus: Elongatocontoderus
- Species: E. fuscofasciatus

Binomial name
- Elongatocontoderus fuscofasciatus Breuning, 1977

Genus of beetles

Elongatocontoderus fuscofasciatus is a species of beetle in the family Cerambycidae, and the only species in the genus Elongatocontoderus. It was described by Breuning in 1977.

== Description ==
The species is 11 millimetres (0.43 in) long and winged. The setae is adpressed and short. Prothorax is transverse
