= Pygmaleptostylus =

Pygmaleptostylus pygmaeus

Scientific classification
- Kingdom: Animalia
- Phylum: Arthropoda
- Class: Insecta
- Order: Coleoptera
- Suborder: Polyphaga
- Infraorder: Cucujiformia
- Family: Cerambycidae
- Genus: Pygmaleptostylus
- Species: P. pygmaeus

Binomial name
- Pygmaleptostylus pygmaeus (Fisher, 1926)

Genus of beetles

Pygmaleptostylus pygmaeus is a species of beetle in the family Cerambycidae, the only species in the genus Pygmaleptostylus.
