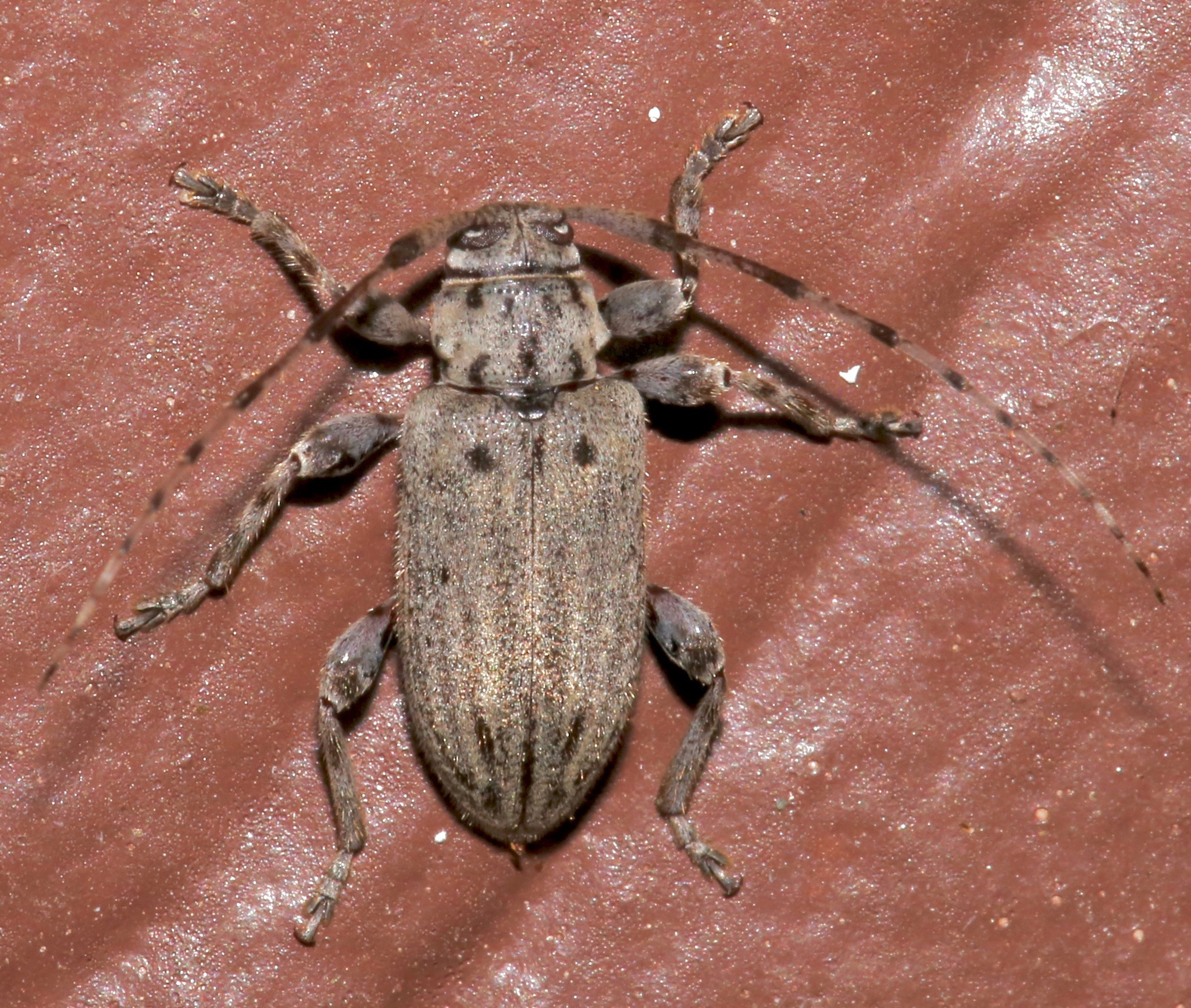

Scientific classification
- Kingdom: Animalia
- Phylum: Arthropoda
- Class: Insecta
- Order: Coleoptera
- Suborder: Polyphaga
- Infraorder: Cucujiformia
- Family: Cerambycidae
- Genus: Glaucotes
- Species: G. yuccivorus

Binomial name
- Glaucotes yuccivorus Fall, 1907

= Glaucotes =

Genus of beetles

Glaucotes yuccivorus is a species of longhorn beetles of the subfamily Lamiinae, and the only species in the genus Glaucotes. It was described by Fall in 1907.
