= Ozineus =

Ozineus elongatus

Scientific classification
- Domain: Eukaryota
- Kingdom: Animalia
- Phylum: Arthropoda
- Class: Insecta
- Order: Coleoptera
- Suborder: Polyphaga
- Infraorder: Cucujiformia
- Family: Cerambycidae
- Genus: Ozineus; Bates, 1863
- Species: O. elongatus

Binomial name
- Ozineus elongatus Bates, 1863

Genus of beetles

Ozineus elongatus is a species of beetle in the family Cerambycidae, the only species in the genus Ozineus.
