= Georgeana (beetle) =

Georgeana azurea

Scientific classification
- Kingdom: Animalia
- Phylum: Arthropoda
- Class: Insecta
- Order: Coleoptera
- Suborder: Polyphaga
- Infraorder: Cucujiformia
- Family: Cerambycidae
- Genus: Georgeana
- Species: G. azurea

Binomial name
- Georgeana azurea Monne & Monne, 2011

Genus of beetles

Georgeana azurea is a species of beetle in the family Cerambycidae, the only species in the genus Georgeana.
