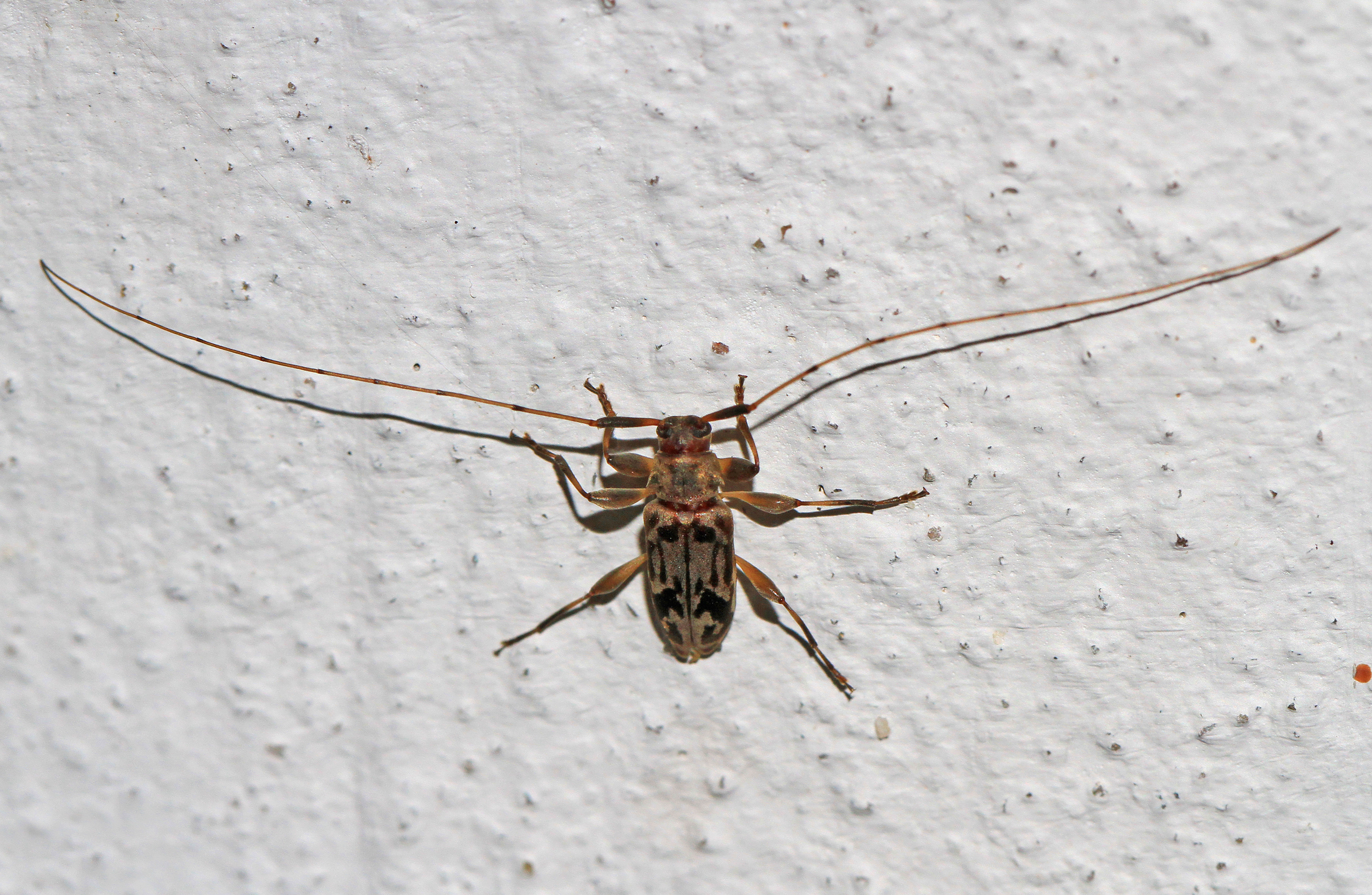
- Urgleptes signatus

Scientific classification
- Kingdom: Animalia
- Phylum: Arthropoda
- Class: Insecta
- Order: Coleoptera
- Suborder: Polyphaga
- Infraorder: Cucujiformia
- Family: Cerambycidae
- Tribe: Acanthocinini
- Genus: Urgleptes; Dillon, 1956

Type species
- Liopus signatus LeConte, 1852

Species
- See text

= Urgleptes =

Genus of longhorn beetles

Urgleptes is a genus of longhorn beetles of the subfamily Lamiinae. It was described by Dillon in 1956.

== Species ==
- Urgleptes abstersus (Bates, 1885)
- Urgleptes amoenulus (Bates, 1863)
- Urgleptes amplicollis (Bates, 1885)
- Urgleptes bicoloratus Gilmour, 1960
- Urgleptes bimaculatus Gilmour, 1960
- Urgleptes bivittatus Gilmour, 1961
- Urgleptes borikensis Micheli & Micheli, 2004
- Urgleptes bruchi (Melzer, 1932)
- Urgleptes callizonus (Bates, 1885)
- Urgleptes cazieri Gilmour, 1961
- Urgleptes celtis (Schaeffer, 1905)
- Urgleptes chamaeropsis (Fisher, 1926)
- Urgleptes charillus (Bates, 1885)
- Urgleptes clarkei Chemsak, 1966
- Urgleptes clerulus (Bates, 1881)
- Urgleptes cobbeni Gilmour, 1963
- Urgleptes debilis (Melzer, 1932)
- Urgleptes decens (Melzer, 1932)
- Urgleptes delicatus (Bates, 1863)
- Urgleptes deliciolus (Bates, 1863)
- Urgleptes dorcadioides (White, 1855)
- Urgleptes dorotheae Gilmour, 1960
- Urgleptes duffyi Gilmour, 1961
- Urgleptes euprepes (Bates, 1885)
- Urgleptes facetus (Say, 1826)
- Urgleptes fasciatus (Bates, 1881)
- Urgleptes foveatocollis (Hamilton in Leng & Hamilton, 1896)
- Urgleptes franciscanus (Melzer, 1935)
- Urgleptes freudei Gilmour, 1959
- Urgleptes gahani Chalumeau, 1983
- Urgleptes guadeloupensis (Fleutiaux & Sallé, 1889)
- Urgleptes haitiensis Gilmour, 1963
- Urgleptes histrionella (Bates, 1885)
- Urgleptes humilis (Bates, 1863)
- Urgleptes hummelincki Gilmour, 1968
- Urgleptes inops (Bates, 1863)
- Urgleptes kuscheli Linsley & Chemsak, 1966
- Urgleptes laticollis (Bates, 1881)
- Urgleptes laxicollis Gilmour, 1960
- Urgleptes leopaulini Touroult, 2004
- Urgleptes literatus (Bates, 1885)
- Urgleptes litoralis Gilmour, 1962
- Urgleptes maculatus Gilmour, 1962
- Urgleptes mancus (Melzer, 1932)
- Urgleptes melzeri Gilmour, 1959
- Urgleptes minutissimus (Bates, 1863)
- Urgleptes miser (Bates, 1863)
- Urgleptes mixtus (Bates, 1881)
- Urgleptes multinotatus (Bates, 1881)
- Urgleptes mundulus (Bates, 1885)
- Urgleptes musculus (Bates, 1863)
- Urgleptes nanus (Melzer, 1934)
- Urgleptes nigridorsis (Bates, 1885)
- Urgleptes obscurellus (Bates, 1863)
- Urgleptes ornatissimus (Bates, 1885)
- Urgleptes ovalis (Bates, 1866)
- Urgleptes ozophagus Chemsak & Feller, 1988
- Urgleptes pallidulus (Bates, 1885)
- Urgleptes pareuprepes Gilmour, 1960
- Urgleptes physoderus (Bates, 1885)
- Urgleptes pluristrigosus (Bates, 1885)
- Urgleptes prolixus (Melzer, 1931)
- Urgleptes puertoricensis Gilmour, 1963
- Urgleptes puerulus (Melzer, 1932)
- Urgleptes pusillus (Melzer, 1932)
- Urgleptes querci (Fitch, 1858)
- Urgleptes recki (Melzer, 1934)
- Urgleptes ruficollis (Bates, 1881)
- Urgleptes sandersoni Gilmour, 1963
- Urgleptes signatus (LeConte, 1852)
- Urgleptes sinuosus Gilmour, 1960
- Urgleptes sordidus (Bates, 1881)
- Urgleptes spinifer (Bates, 1863)
- Urgleptes trilineatus Gilmour, 1962
- Urgleptes trivittatus (Bates, 1885)
- Urgleptes tumidicollis (Bates, 1881)
- Urgleptes unilineatus (Bates, 1872)
- Urgleptes vauriearum Gilmour, 1960
- Urgleptes villiersi Gilmour, 1962
- Urgleptes xantho (Bates, 1885)
