= Urgleptes laxicollis =

Scientific classification
- Kingdom: Animalia
- Phylum: Arthropoda
- Class: Insecta
- Order: Coleoptera
- Suborder: Polyphaga
- Infraorder: Cucujiformia
- Family: Cerambycidae
- Genus: Urgleptes
- Species: U. laxicollis

Binomial name
- Urgleptes laxicollis Gilmour, 1960

Species of beetle

Urgleptes laxicollis is a species of beetle in the family Cerambycidae. It was described by Gilmour in 1960.
