= Urgleptes bivittatus =

Scientific classification
- Kingdom: Animalia
- Phylum: Arthropoda
- Class: Insecta
- Order: Coleoptera
- Suborder: Polyphaga
- Infraorder: Cucujiformia
- Family: Cerambycidae
- Genus: Urgleptes
- Species: U. bivittatus

Binomial name
- Urgleptes bivittatus Gilmour, 1961

Species of beetle

Urgleptes bivittatus is a species of beetle in the family Cerambycidae. It was described by Gilmour in 1961.
