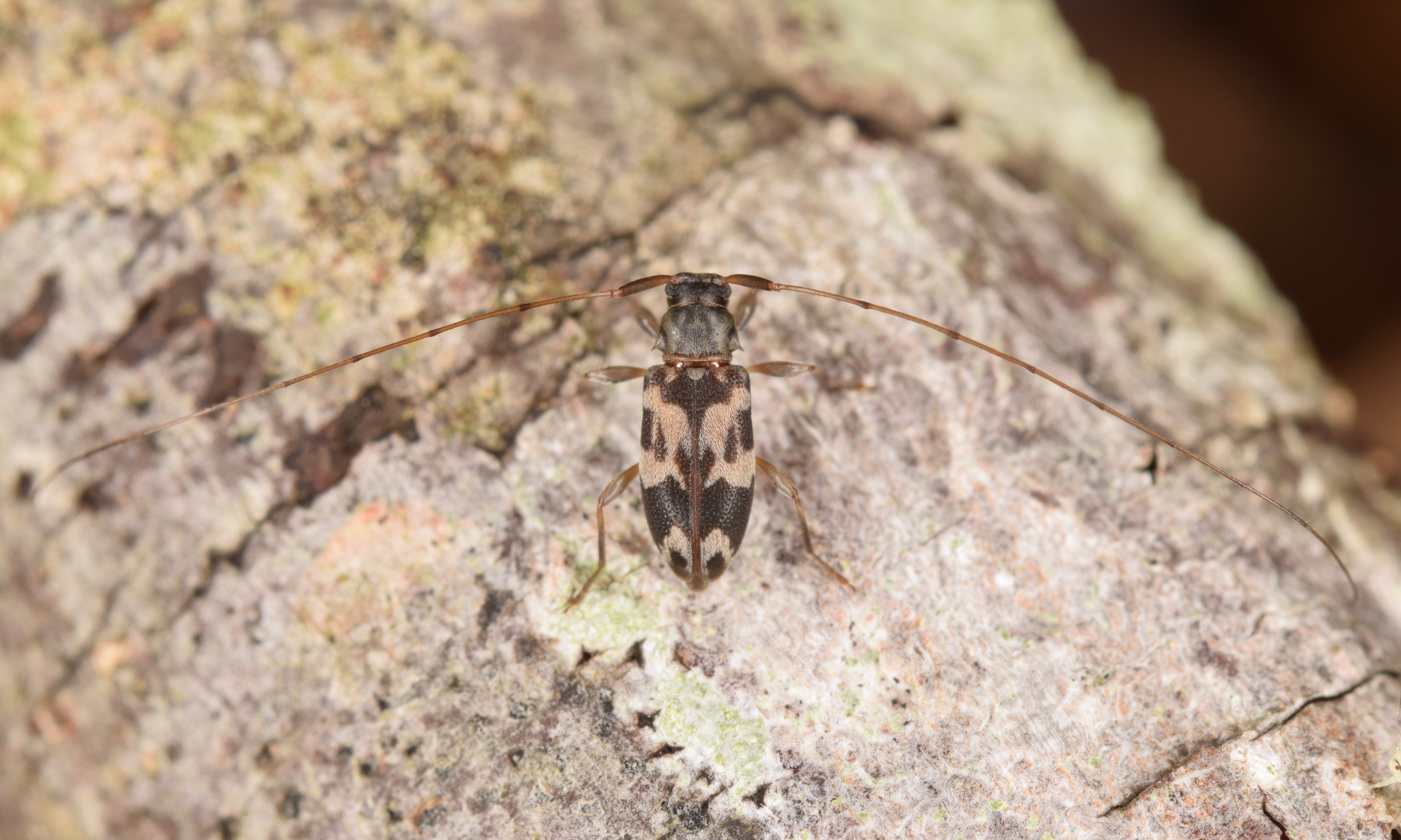

Scientific classification
- Kingdom: Animalia
- Phylum: Arthropoda
- Class: Insecta
- Order: Coleoptera
- Suborder: Polyphaga
- Infraorder: Cucujiformia
- Family: Cerambycidae
- Genus: Urgleptes
- Species: U. facetus

Binomial name
- Urgleptes facetus (Say, 1826)

= Urgleptes facetus =

Species of beetle

Urgleptes facetus is a species of beetle in the family Cerambycidae. It was described by Say in 1826.
