= Urgleptes kuscheli =

Scientific classification
- Kingdom: Animalia
- Phylum: Arthropoda
- Clade: Pancrustacea
- Class: Insecta
- Order: Coleoptera
- Suborder: Polyphaga
- Infraorder: Cucujiformia
- Family: Cerambycidae
- Genus: Urgleptes
- Species: U. kuscheli

Binomial name
- Urgleptes kuscheli Linsley & Chemsak, 1966

Species of beetle

Urgleptes kuscheli is a species of beetle in the family Cerambycidae. It was described by Linsley and Chemsak in 1966.
