= Urgleptes delicatus =

Scientific classification
- Kingdom: Animalia
- Phylum: Arthropoda
- Class: Insecta
- Order: Coleoptera
- Suborder: Polyphaga
- Infraorder: Cucujiformia
- Family: Cerambycidae
- Genus: Urgleptes
- Species: U. delicatus

Binomial name
- Urgleptes delicatus (Bates, 1863)

Species of beetle

Urgleptes delicatus is a species of beetle in the family Cerambycidae. It was described by Bates in 1863.
