= Urgleptes trivittatus =

Scientific classification
- Kingdom: Animalia
- Phylum: Arthropoda
- Class: Insecta
- Order: Coleoptera
- Suborder: Polyphaga
- Infraorder: Cucujiformia
- Family: Cerambycidae
- Genus: Urgleptes
- Species: U. trivittatus

Binomial name
- Urgleptes trivittatus (Bates, 1885)

Species of beetle

Urgleptes trivittatus is a species of beetle belonging to the family Cerambycidae. It was described by Bates in 1885.
