= Urgleptes puerulus =

Scientific classification
- Kingdom: Animalia
- Phylum: Arthropoda
- Class: Insecta
- Order: Coleoptera
- Suborder: Polyphaga
- Infraorder: Cucujiformia
- Family: Cerambycidae
- Genus: Urgleptes
- Species: U. puerulus

Binomial name
- Urgleptes puerulus (Melzer, 1932)

Species of beetle

Urgleptes puerulus is a species of beetle in the family Cerambycidae. It was described by Melzer in 1932.
