= Urgleptes borikensis =

Scientific classification
- Kingdom: Animalia
- Phylum: Arthropoda
- Class: Insecta
- Order: Coleoptera
- Suborder: Polyphaga
- Infraorder: Cucujiformia
- Family: Cerambycidae
- Genus: Urgleptes
- Species: U. borikensis

Binomial name
- Urgleptes borikensis Micheli & Micheli, 2004

Species of beetle

Urgleptes borikensis is a species of beetle in the family Cerambycidae. It was described by Micheli and Micheli in 2004.
