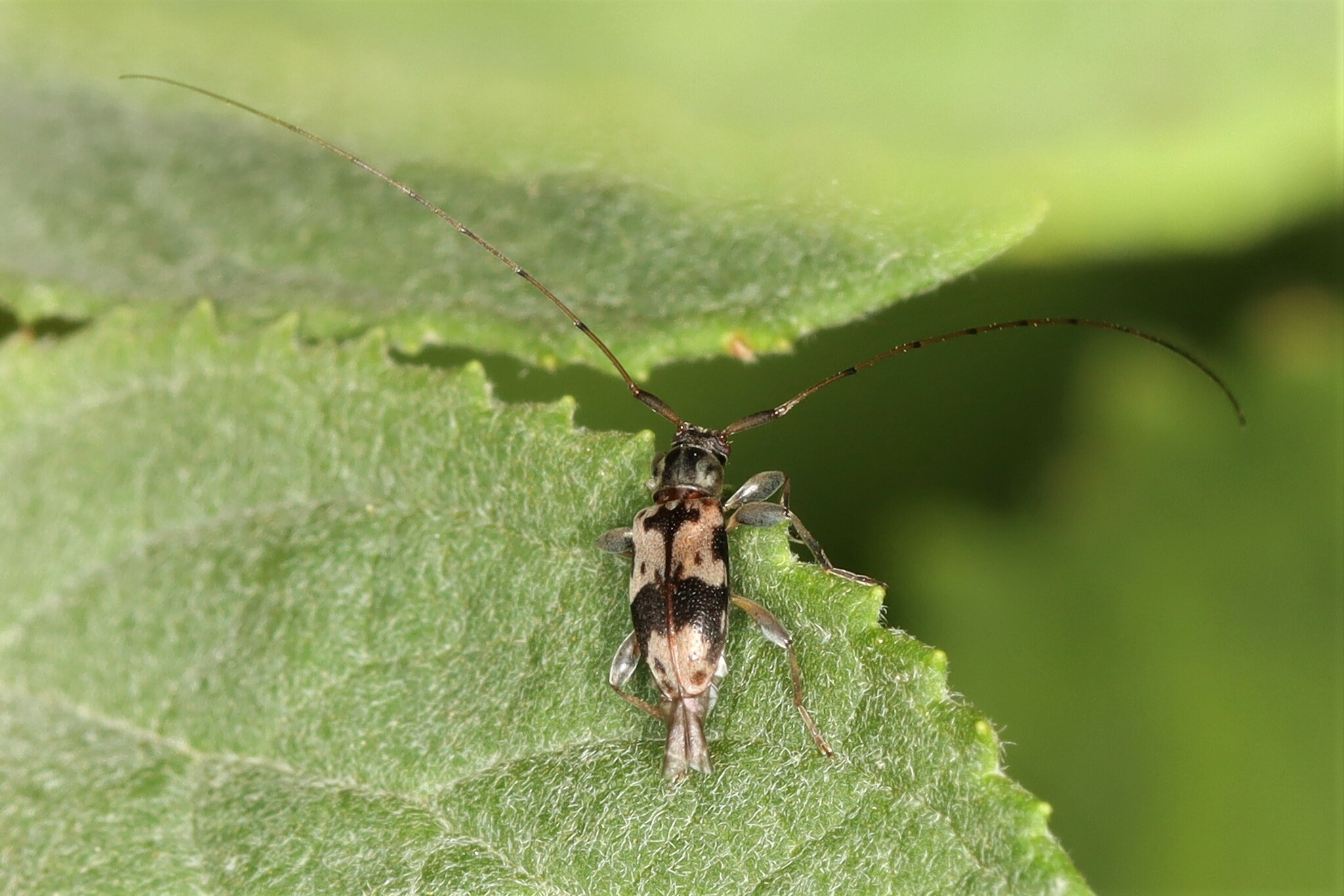
- Urgleptes querci, Massachusetts

Scientific classification
- Kingdom: Animalia
- Phylum: Arthropoda
- Class: Insecta
- Order: Coleoptera
- Suborder: Polyphaga
- Infraorder: Cucujiformia
- Family: Cerambycidae
- Genus: Urgleptes
- Species: U. querci

Binomial name
- Urgleptes querci (Fitch, 1858)

= Urgleptes querci =

Species of beetle

Urgleptes querci is a species of beetle in the family Cerambycidae. It was described by Asa Fitch in 1858.
