= Urgleptes foveatocollis =

Scientific classification
- Kingdom: Animalia
- Phylum: Arthropoda
- Class: Insecta
- Order: Coleoptera
- Suborder: Polyphaga
- Infraorder: Cucujiformia
- Family: Cerambycidae
- Genus: Urgleptes
- Species: U. foveatocollis

Binomial name
- Urgleptes foveatocollis (Hamilton in Leng & Hamilton, 1896)

Species of beetle

Urgleptes foveatocollis is a species of beetle in the family Cerambycidae. It was described by Hamilton in 1896.
