= Urgleptes leopaulini =

Scientific classification
- Kingdom: Animalia
- Phylum: Arthropoda
- Class: Insecta
- Order: Coleoptera
- Suborder: Polyphaga
- Infraorder: Cucujiformia
- Family: Cerambycidae
- Genus: Urgleptes
- Species: U. leopaulini

Binomial name
- Urgleptes leopaulini Touroult, 2004

Species of beetle

Urgleptes leopaulini is a species of beetle in the family Cerambycidae. It was described by Touroult in 2004. Its range includes the Caribbean islands of Guadeloupe, Martinique, and Saint Lucia.
