= Urgleptes guadeloupensis =

Scientific classification
- Kingdom: Animalia
- Phylum: Arthropoda
- Class: Insecta
- Order: Coleoptera
- Suborder: Polyphaga
- Infraorder: Cucujiformia
- Family: Cerambycidae
- Genus: Urgleptes
- Species: U. guadeloupensis

Binomial name
- Urgleptes guadeloupensis (Fleutiaux & Sallé, 1889)

Species of beetle

Urgleptes guadeloupensis is a species of beetle in the family Cerambycidae. It was described by Fleutiaux and Sallé in 1889.
