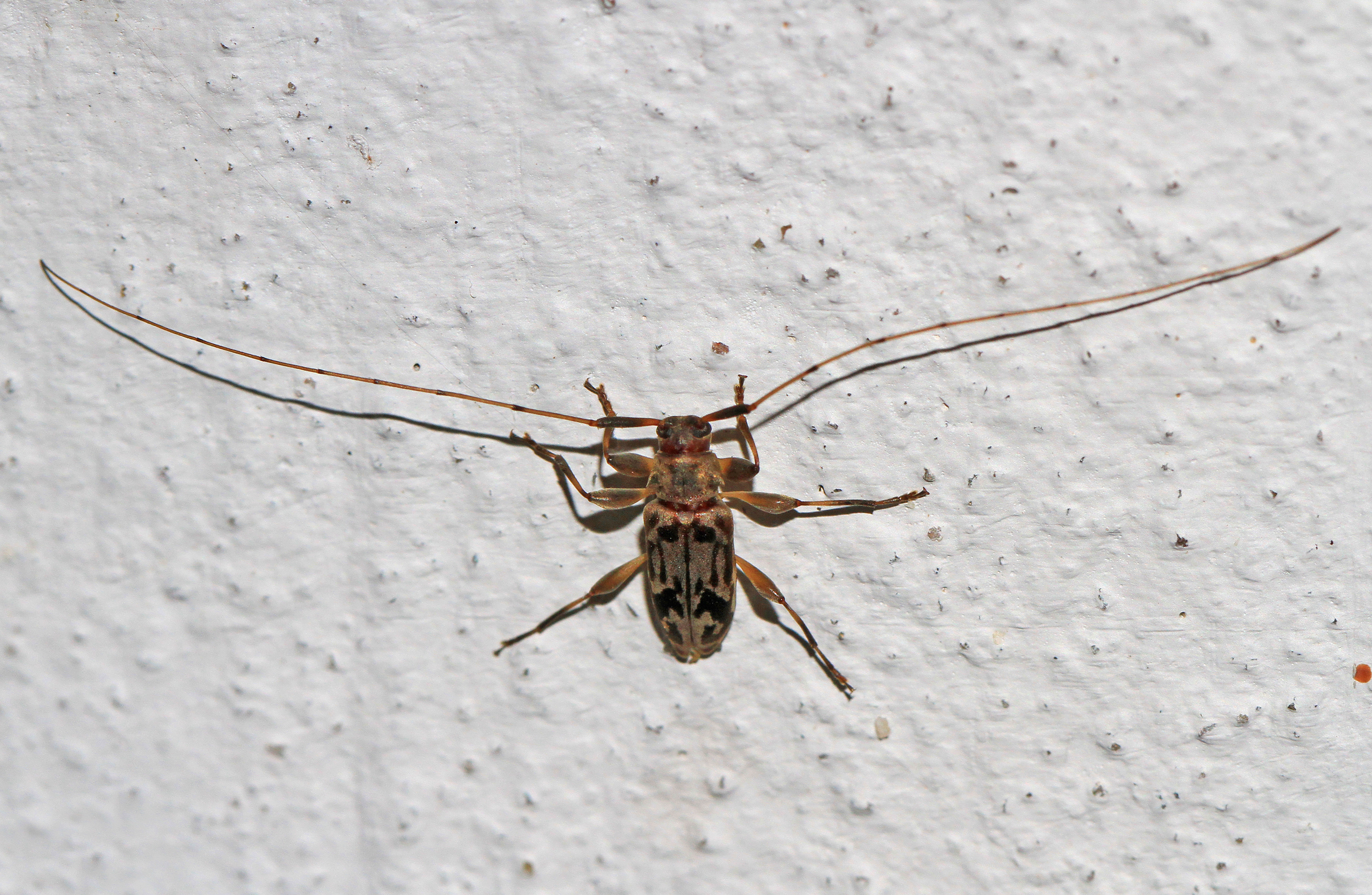
- Urgleptes signatus

Scientific classification
- Kingdom: Animalia
- Phylum: Arthropoda
- Class: Insecta
- Order: Coleoptera
- Suborder: Polyphaga
- Infraorder: Cucujiformia
- Family: Cerambycidae
- Genus: Urgleptes
- Species: U. signatus

Binomial name
- Urgleptes signatus (LeConte, 1852)

= Urgleptes signatus =

Species of beetle

Urgleptes signatus is a species of beetle in the family Cerambycidae. It was described by John Lawrence LeConte in 1852.
