= Urgleptes haitiensis =

Scientific classification
- Kingdom: Animalia
- Phylum: Arthropoda
- Class: Insecta
- Order: Coleoptera
- Suborder: Polyphaga
- Infraorder: Cucujiformia
- Family: Cerambycidae
- Genus: Urgleptes
- Species: U. haitiensis

Binomial name
- Urgleptes haitiensis Gilmour, 1963

Species of beetle

Urgleptes haitiensis is a species of beetle in the family Cerambycidae. It was described by Gilmour in 1963.
