= Urgleptes dorcadioides =

Scientific classification
- Kingdom: Animalia
- Phylum: Arthropoda
- Class: Insecta
- Order: Coleoptera
- Suborder: Polyphaga
- Infraorder: Cucujiformia
- Family: Cerambycidae
- Genus: Urgleptes
- Species: U. dorcadioides

Binomial name
- Urgleptes dorcadioides (White, 1855)

Species of beetle

Urgleptes dorcadioides is a species of beetle in the family Cerambycidae. It was described by White in 1855.
