= Urgleptes celtis =

Scientific classification
- Kingdom: Animalia
- Phylum: Arthropoda
- Class: Insecta
- Order: Coleoptera
- Suborder: Polyphaga
- Infraorder: Cucujiformia
- Family: Cerambycidae
- Genus: Urgleptes
- Species: U. celtis

Binomial name
- Urgleptes celtis (Schaeffer, 1905)

Species of beetle

Urgleptes celtis is a species of beetle in the family Cerambycidae. It was described by Schaeffer in 1905.
