= Urgleptes hummelincki =

Scientific classification
- Kingdom: Animalia
- Phylum: Arthropoda
- Class: Insecta
- Order: Coleoptera
- Suborder: Polyphaga
- Infraorder: Cucujiformia
- Family: Cerambycidae
- Genus: Urgleptes
- Species: U. hummelincki

Binomial name
- Urgleptes hummelincki Gilmour, 1968

Species of beetle

Urgleptes hummelincki is a species of beetle in the family Cerambycidae. It was described by Gilmour in 1968.
