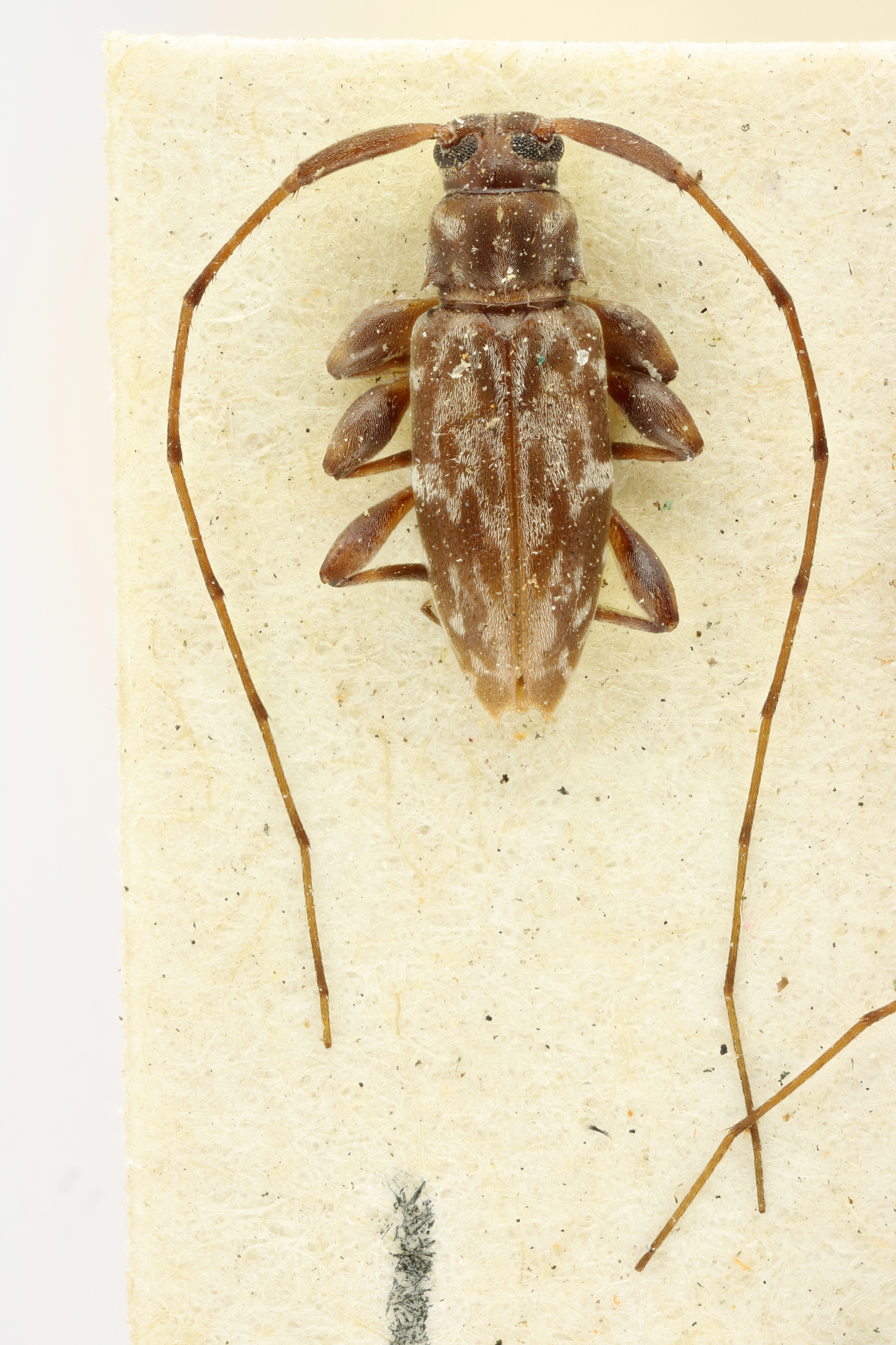

Scientific classification
- Kingdom: Animalia
- Phylum: Arthropoda
- Class: Insecta
- Order: Coleoptera
- Suborder: Polyphaga
- Infraorder: Cucujiformia
- Family: Cerambycidae
- Genus: Urgleptes
- Species: U. multinotatus

Binomial name
- Urgleptes multinotatus (Bates, 1881)

= Urgleptes multinotatus =

Species of beetle

Urgleptes multinotatus is a species of beetle in the family Cerambycidae. It was described by Bates in 1881.
