= Urgleptes clarkei =

Scientific classification
- Kingdom: Animalia
- Phylum: Arthropoda
- Class: Insecta
- Order: Coleoptera
- Suborder: Polyphaga
- Infraorder: Cucujiformia
- Family: Cerambycidae
- Genus: Urgleptes
- Species: U. clarkei

Binomial name
- Urgleptes clarkei Chemsak, 1966

Species of beetle

Urgleptes clarkei is a species of beetle in the family Cerambycidae. It was described by Chemsak in 1966.
