= Urgleptes chamaeropsis =

Scientific classification
- Kingdom: Animalia
- Phylum: Arthropoda
- Class: Insecta
- Order: Coleoptera
- Suborder: Polyphaga
- Infraorder: Cucujiformia
- Family: Cerambycidae
- Genus: Urgleptes
- Species: U. chamaeropsis

Binomial name
- Urgleptes chamaeropsis (Fisher, 1926)

Species of beetle

Urgleptes chamaeropsis is a species of beetle in the family Cerambycidae. It was described by Fisher in 1926.
