= Urgleptes ornatissimus =

Scientific classification
- Kingdom: Animalia
- Phylum: Arthropoda
- Class: Insecta
- Order: Coleoptera
- Suborder: Polyphaga
- Infraorder: Cucujiformia
- Family: Cerambycidae
- Genus: Urgleptes
- Species: U. ornatissimus

Binomial name
- Urgleptes ornatissimus (Bates, 1885)

Species of beetle

Urgleptes ornatissimus is a species of beetle in the family Cerambycidae. It was described by Bates in 1885. It can be identified by its characteristically long antennae and light and dark-brown coloration.
