= Urgleptes clerulus =

Scientific classification
- Kingdom: Animalia
- Phylum: Arthropoda
- Class: Insecta
- Order: Coleoptera
- Suborder: Polyphaga
- Infraorder: Cucujiformia
- Family: Cerambycidae
- Genus: Urgleptes
- Species: U. clerulus

Binomial name
- Urgleptes clerulus (Bates, 1881)

Species of beetle

Urgleptes clerulus is a species of beetle in the family Cerambycidae. It was described by Henry Walter Bates in 1881.
