= Urgleptes ozophagus =

Scientific classification
- Kingdom: Animalia
- Phylum: Arthropoda
- Class: Insecta
- Order: Coleoptera
- Suborder: Polyphaga
- Infraorder: Cucujiformia
- Family: Cerambycidae
- Genus: Urgleptes
- Species: U. ozophagus

Binomial name
- Urgleptes ozophagus Chemsak & Feller, 1988

Species of beetle

Urgleptes ozophagus is a species of beetle in the family Cerambycidae. It was described by Chemsak and Feller in 1988.
