= Urgleptes nanus =

Scientific classification
- Kingdom: Animalia
- Phylum: Arthropoda
- Class: Insecta
- Order: Coleoptera
- Suborder: Polyphaga
- Infraorder: Cucujiformia
- Family: Cerambycidae
- Genus: Urgleptes
- Species: U. nanus

Binomial name
- Urgleptes nanus (Melzer, 1934)

Species of beetle

Urgleptes nanus is a species of beetle in the family Cerambycidae. It was described by Melzer in 1934.
