= Urgleptes gahani =

Scientific classification
- Kingdom: Animalia
- Phylum: Arthropoda
- Class: Insecta
- Order: Coleoptera
- Suborder: Polyphaga
- Infraorder: Cucujiformia
- Family: Cerambycidae
- Genus: Urgleptes
- Species: U. gahani

Binomial name
- Urgleptes gahani Chalumeau, 1983

Species of beetle

Urgleptes gahani is a species of beetle in the family Cerambycidae. It was described by Chalumeau in 1983.
