= Polymitoleiopus mancus =

Scientific classification
- Kingdom: Animalia
- Phylum: Arthropoda
- Clade: Pancrustacea
- Class: Insecta
- Order: Coleoptera
- Suborder: Polyphaga
- Infraorder: Cucujiformia
- Family: Cerambycidae
- Genus: Polymitoleiopus
- Species: P. mancus

Binomial name
- Polymitoleiopus mancus (Melzer, 1932)

Synonyms
- Lepturges manca Melzer, 1932; Urgleptes mancus

Species of beetle

Polymitoleiopus mancus is a species of beetle in the family Cerambycidae. It was described by Melzer in 1932. It is found in Brazil (Rio de Janeiro, São Paulo, Paraná, Santa Catarina, Rio Grande do Sul), Argentina (Buenos Aires) and Uruguay.
