= Polymitoleiopus debilis =

Scientific classification
- Kingdom: Animalia
- Phylum: Arthropoda
- Clade: Pancrustacea
- Class: Insecta
- Order: Coleoptera
- Suborder: Polyphaga
- Infraorder: Cucujiformia
- Family: Cerambycidae
- Genus: Polymitoleiopus
- Species: P. debilis

Binomial name
- Polymitoleiopus debilis (Melzer, 1932)

Synonyms
- Lepturges debilis Melzer, 1932; Urgleptes debilis

Species of beetle

Polymitoleiopus debilis is a species of beetle in the family Cerambycidae. It was described by Melzer in 1932. It is found in Brazil (Rio de Janeiro, São Paulo, Paraná, Santa Catarina).
