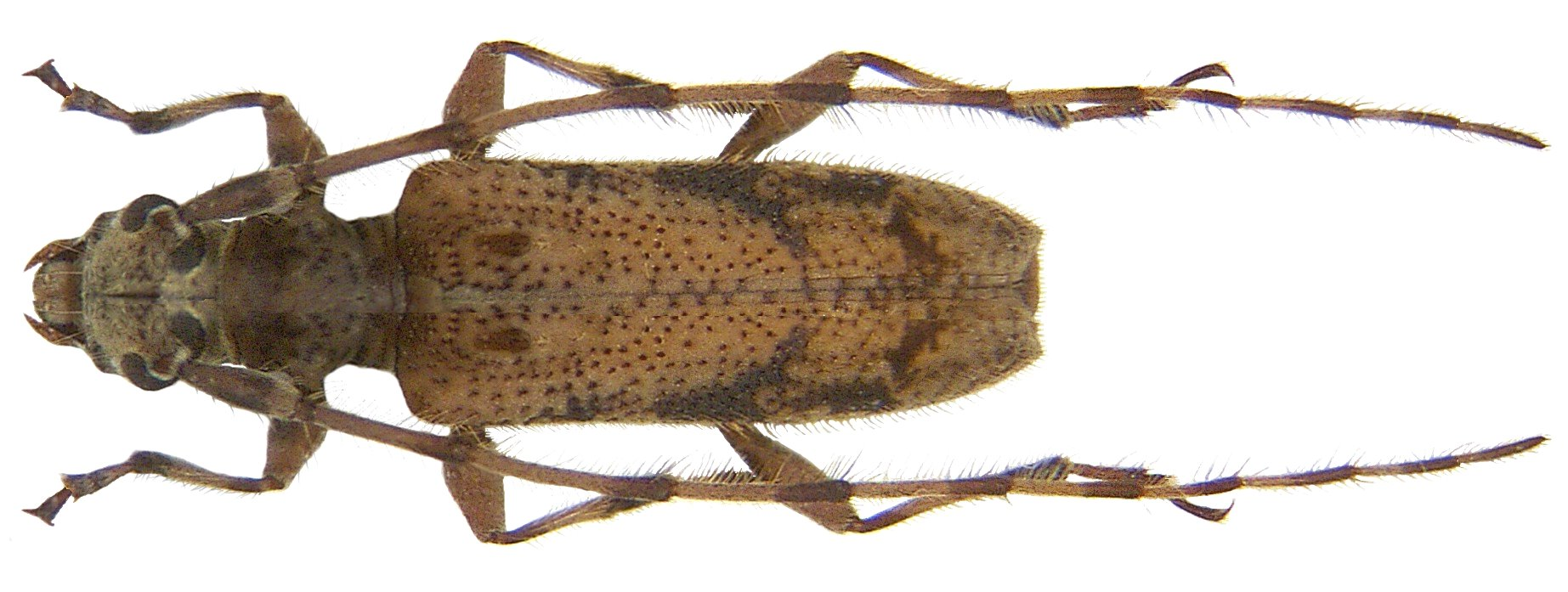
- Ostedes variegata

Scientific classification
- Kingdom: Animalia
- Phylum: Arthropoda
- Class: Insecta
- Order: Coleoptera
- Suborder: Polyphaga
- Infraorder: Cucujiformia
- Family: Cerambycidae
- Genus: Ostedes

= Ostedes =

Genus of beetles

Ostedes is a genus of beetles in the family Cerambycidae, containing the following species:

subgenus Dentatostedes

- Ostedes bidentata (Pic, 1933)

subgenus Ostedes

- Ostedes albomarmorata Breuning, 1969
- Ostedes albosparsa (Pic, 1926)
- Ostedes andamanica Breuning, 1958
- Ostedes binodosa Gressitt, 1945
- Ostedes borneana Breuning, 1964
- Ostedes brunneovariegata Breuning, 1961
- Ostedes coomani Pic, 1927
- Ostedes dentata Pic, 1936
- Ostedes discovitticollis Breuning, 1956
- Ostedes enganensis Breuning, 1982
- Ostedes griseoapicaloides Breuning, 1977
- Ostedes harmandi Breuning, 1968
- Ostedes inermis Schwarzer, 1925
- Ostedes kadleci Danilevsky, 1992
- Ostedes laterifusca Breuning, 1969
- Ostedes macrophthalma Breuning, 1977
- Ostedes ochreosparsa Breuning, 1964
- Ostedes pauperata Pascoe, 1859
- Ostedes perakensis Breuning, 1969
- Ostedes rufipennis Pic, 1944
- Ostedes sikkimensis Breuning, 1958
- Ostedes subfasciata Matsushita, 1933
- Ostedes subochreosparsa Breuning, 1965
- Ostedes subrufipennis Breuning, 1963
- Ostedes sumatrana Pic, 1944
- Ostedes tonkinea Pic, 1944
- Ostedes tuberculata (Pic, 1925)
- Ostedes variegata Aurivillius, 1913

subgenus Trichostedes

- Ostedes assamana Breuning, 1961
- Ostedes laosensis Breuning, 1963
- Ostedes ochreomarmorata Breuning, 1963
- Ostedes ochreopicta Breuning, 1965
- Ostedes spinipennis Breuning, 1964
