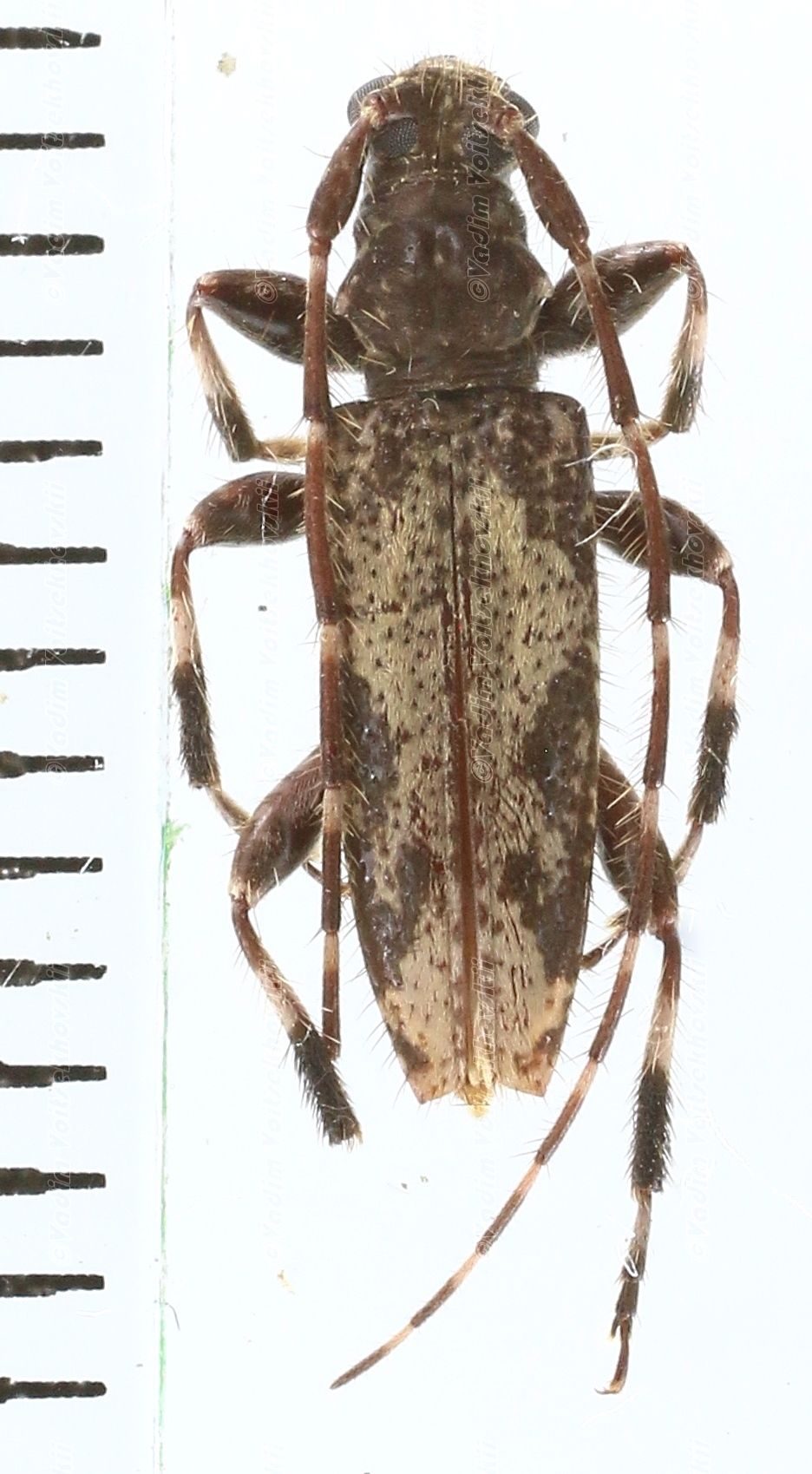

Scientific classification
- Domain: Eukaryota
- Kingdom: Animalia
- Phylum: Arthropoda
- Class: Insecta
- Order: Coleoptera
- Suborder: Polyphaga
- Infraorder: Cucujiformia
- Family: Cerambycidae
- Genus: Ostedes
- Species: O. pauperata

Binomial name
- Ostedes pauperata Pascoe, 1859

= Ostedes pauperata =

Species of beetle

Ostedes pauperata is a species of beetle in the family Cerambycidae. It was described by Pascoe in 1859.
