= Ostedes discovitticollis =

Scientific classification
- Kingdom: Animalia
- Phylum: Arthropoda
- Class: Insecta
- Order: Coleoptera
- Suborder: Polyphaga
- Infraorder: Cucujiformia
- Family: Cerambycidae
- Genus: Ostedes
- Species: O. discovitticollis

Binomial name
- Ostedes discovitticollis Breuning, 1956

Species of beetle

Ostedes discovitticollis is a species of beetle in the family Cerambycidae. It was described by Breuning in 1956.
