= Ostedes kadleci =

Scientific classification
- Kingdom: Animalia
- Phylum: Arthropoda
- Class: Insecta
- Order: Coleoptera
- Suborder: Polyphaga
- Infraorder: Cucujiformia
- Family: Cerambycidae
- Genus: Ostedes
- Species: O. kadleci

Binomial name
- Ostedes kadleci Danilevsky, 1992

Species of beetle

Ostedes kadleci is a species of beetle in the family Cerambycidae. It was described by Mikhail Leontievich Danilevsky in 1992.
