= Ostedes harmandi =

Scientific classification
- Kingdom: Animalia
- Phylum: Arthropoda
- Class: Insecta
- Order: Coleoptera
- Suborder: Polyphaga
- Infraorder: Cucujiformia
- Family: Cerambycidae
- Genus: Ostedes
- Species: O. harmandi

Binomial name
- Ostedes harmandi Breuning, 1968

Species of beetle

Ostedes harmandi is a species of beetle in the family Cerambycidae. It was described by Breuning in 1968.
