= Ostedes bidentata =

Scientific classification
- Kingdom: Animalia
- Phylum: Arthropoda
- Class: Insecta
- Order: Coleoptera
- Suborder: Polyphaga
- Infraorder: Cucujiformia
- Family: Cerambycidae
- Genus: Ostedes
- Species: O. bidentata

Binomial name
- Ostedes bidentata (Pic, 1933)

Species of beetle

Ostedes bidentata is a species of beetle in the family Cerambycidae. It was described by Pic in 1933.
