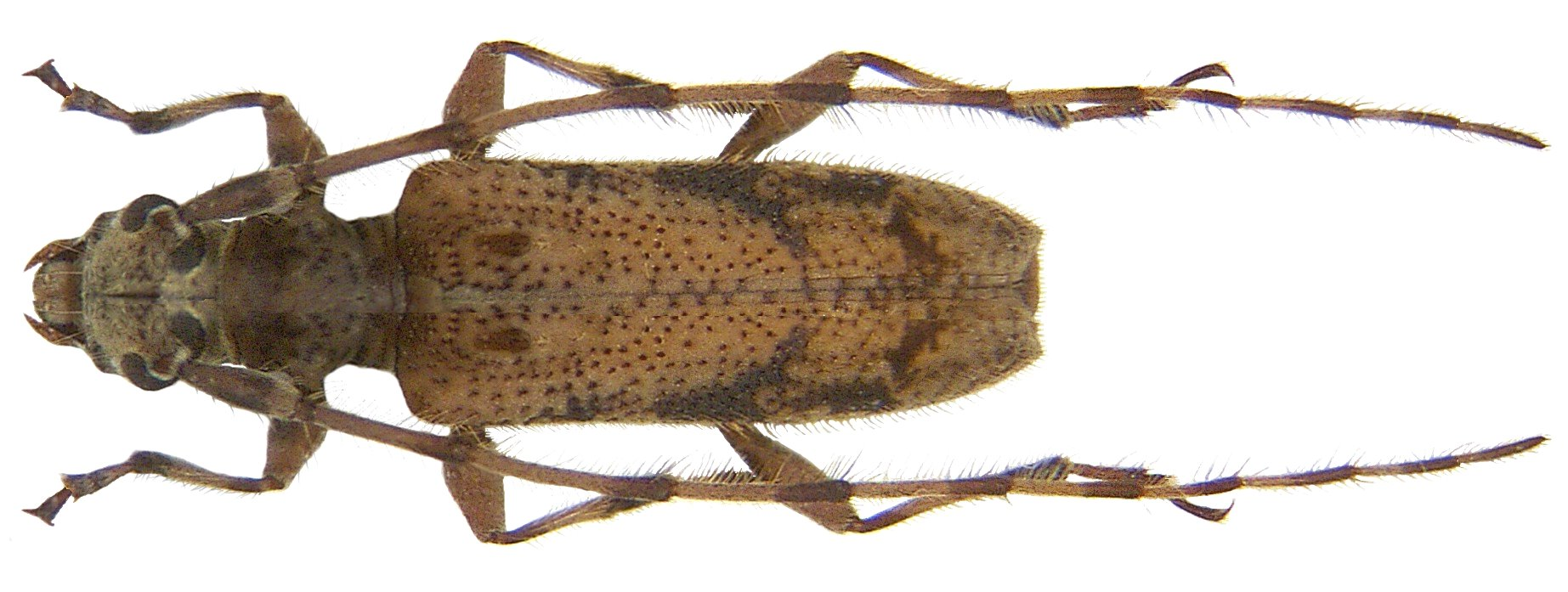

Scientific classification
- Kingdom: Animalia
- Phylum: Arthropoda
- Class: Insecta
- Order: Coleoptera
- Suborder: Polyphaga
- Infraorder: Cucujiformia
- Family: Cerambycidae
- Genus: Ostedes
- Species: O. variegata

Binomial name
- Ostedes variegata Aurivillius, 1913

= Ostedes variegata =

Species of beetle

Ostedes variegata is a species of beetle in the family Cerambycidae. It was described by Per Olof Christopher Aurivillius in 1913.
