= Ostedes brunneovariegata =

Scientific classification
- Kingdom: Animalia
- Phylum: Arthropoda
- Class: Insecta
- Order: Coleoptera
- Suborder: Polyphaga
- Infraorder: Cucujiformia
- Family: Cerambycidae
- Genus: Ostedes
- Species: O. brunneovariegata

Binomial name
- Ostedes brunneovariegata Breuning, 1961

Species of beetle

Ostedes brunneovariegata is a species of beetle in the family Cerambycidae. It was described by Breuning in 1961.
