= Ostedes albosparsa =

Scientific classification
- Kingdom: Animalia
- Phylum: Arthropoda
- Class: Insecta
- Order: Coleoptera
- Suborder: Polyphaga
- Infraorder: Cucujiformia
- Family: Cerambycidae
- Genus: Ostedes
- Species: O. albosparsa

Binomial name
- Ostedes albosparsa (Pic, 1926)

Species of beetle

Ostedes albosparsa is a species of beetle in the family Cerambycidae. It was described by Pic in 1926.
