= Ostedes tonkinea =

Scientific classification
- Kingdom: Animalia
- Phylum: Arthropoda
- Class: Insecta
- Order: Coleoptera
- Suborder: Polyphaga
- Infraorder: Cucujiformia
- Family: Cerambycidae
- Genus: Ostedes
- Species: O. tonkinea

Binomial name
- Ostedes tonkinea Pic, 1944

Species of beetle

Ostedes tonkinea is a species of beetle in the family Cerambycidae. It was described by Maurice Pic in 1944.
