= Ostedes coomani =

Scientific classification
- Kingdom: Animalia
- Phylum: Arthropoda
- Class: Insecta
- Order: Coleoptera
- Suborder: Polyphaga
- Infraorder: Cucujiformia
- Family: Cerambycidae
- Genus: Ostedes
- Species: O. coomani

Binomial name
- Ostedes coomani Pic, 1927

Species of beetle

Ostedes coomani is a species of beetle in the family Cerambycidae. It was described by Pic in 1927.
