= Ostedes binodosa =

Scientific classification
- Kingdom: Animalia
- Phylum: Arthropoda
- Class: Insecta
- Order: Coleoptera
- Suborder: Polyphaga
- Infraorder: Cucujiformia
- Family: Cerambycidae
- Genus: Ostedes
- Species: O. binodosa

Binomial name
- Ostedes binodosa Gressitt, 1945

Species of beetle

Ostedes binodosa is a species of beetle in the family Cerambycidae. It was described by Gressitt in 1945.
