= Ostedes subfasciata =

Scientific classification
- Kingdom: Animalia
- Phylum: Arthropoda
- Class: Insecta
- Order: Coleoptera
- Suborder: Polyphaga
- Infraorder: Cucujiformia
- Family: Cerambycidae
- Genus: Ostedes
- Species: O. subfasciata

Binomial name
- Ostedes subfasciata Matsushita, 1933

Species of beetle

Ostedes subfasciata is a species of beetle in the family Cerambycidae. It was described by Matsushita in 1933.
