= Ostedes tuberculata =

Scientific classification
- Kingdom: Animalia
- Phylum: Arthropoda
- Class: Insecta
- Order: Coleoptera
- Suborder: Polyphaga
- Infraorder: Cucujiformia
- Family: Cerambycidae
- Genus: Ostedes
- Species: O. tuberculata

Binomial name
- Ostedes tuberculata (Pic, 1925)

Species of beetle

Ostedes tuberculata is a species of beetle in the family Cerambycidae. It was described by Pic in 1925.
