= Styloleptus rhizophorae =

Scientific classification
- Domain: Eukaryota
- Kingdom: Animalia
- Phylum: Arthropoda
- Class: Insecta
- Order: Coleoptera
- Suborder: Polyphaga
- Infraorder: Cucujiformia
- Family: Cerambycidae
- Genus: Styloleptus
- Species: S. rhizophorae

Binomial name
- Styloleptus rhizophorae Chemsak & Feller, 1988

Species of beetle

Styloleptus rhizophorae is a species of beetle in the family Cerambycidae. It was described by Chemsak and Feller in 1988.
