= Styloleptus guilartensis =

Scientific classification
- Domain: Eukaryota
- Kingdom: Animalia
- Phylum: Arthropoda
- Class: Insecta
- Order: Coleoptera
- Suborder: Polyphaga
- Infraorder: Cucujiformia
- Family: Cerambycidae
- Genus: Styloleptus
- Species: S. guilartensis

Binomial name
- Styloleptus guilartensis (Micheli & Micheli, 2004)

Species of beetle

Styloleptus guilartensis is a species of beetle in the family Cerambycidae. It was described by Micheli and Micheli in 2004.
