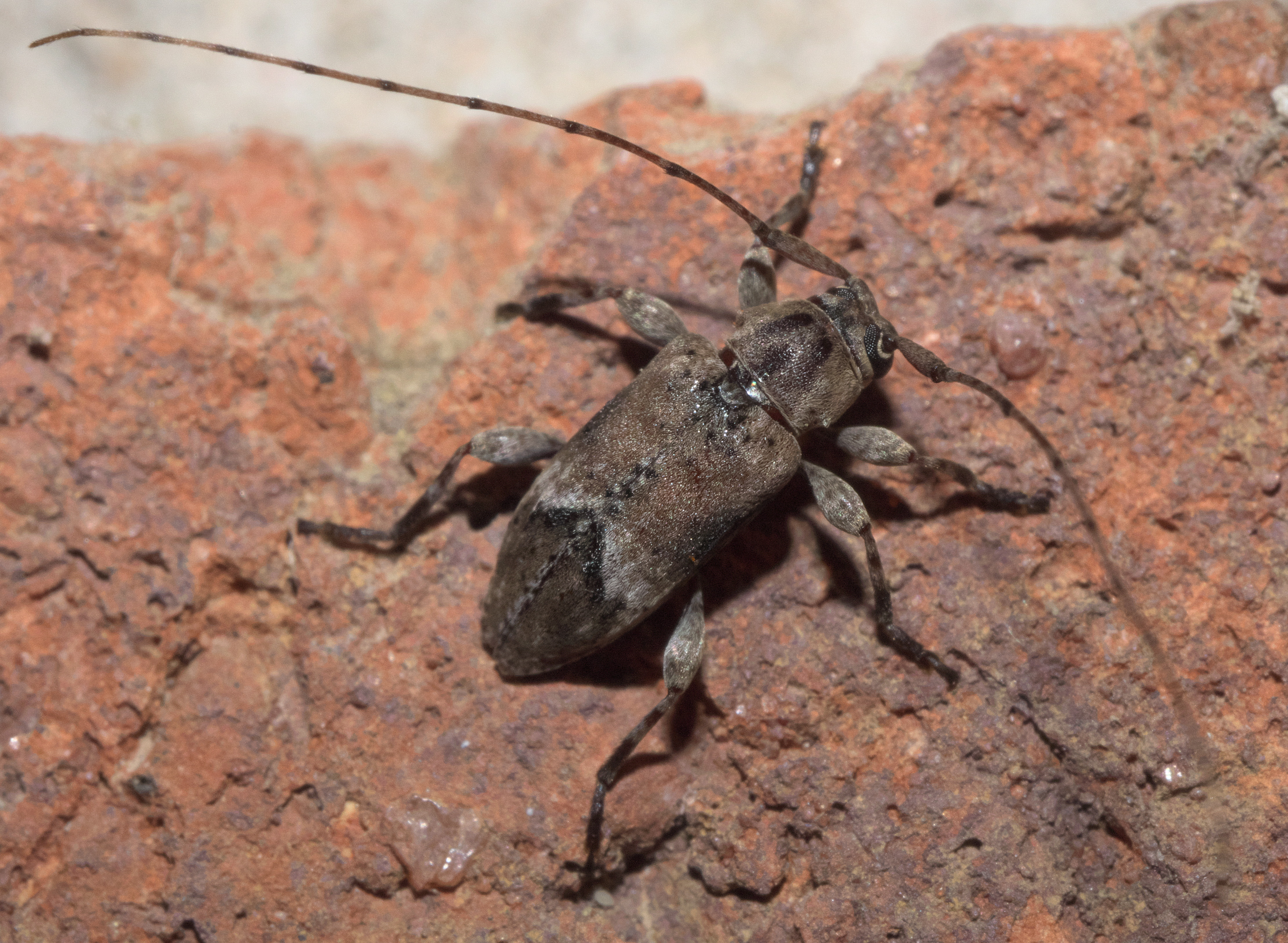
- Styloleptus biustus

Scientific classification
- Domain: Eukaryota
- Kingdom: Animalia
- Phylum: Arthropoda
- Class: Insecta
- Order: Coleoptera
- Suborder: Polyphaga
- Infraorder: Cucujiformia
- Family: Cerambycidae
- Subfamily: Lamiinae
- Tribe: Acanthocinini
- Genus: Styloleptus; Dillon, 1956

= Styloleptus =

Genus of beetles

Styloleptus is a genus of longhorn beetles of the subfamily Lamiinae. It was described by Dillon in 1956.

== Species ==
- Styloleptus atrovittatus (Fisher, 1925)
- Styloleptus biustus (LeConte, 1852)
- Styloleptus brunneofasciatus (Fisher, 1935)
- Styloleptus caymanensis (Fisher, 1948)
- Styloleptus cubanus (Fisher, 1926)
- Styloleptus darlingtoni (Fisher, 1942)
- Styloleptus dozieri (Fisher, 1932)
- Styloleptus guilartensis (Micheli & Micheli, 2004)
- Styloleptus inermis (Fabricius, 1801)
- Styloleptus infuscatus (Fisher, 1932)
- Styloleptus laticollis (Fisher, 1925)
- Styloleptus lewisi (Fisher, 1948)
- Styloleptus nigricans (Fisher, 1935)
- Styloleptus nigrofasciatus (Gilmour, 1963)
- Styloleptus nigronotatus (Zayas, 1975)
- Styloleptus pilosellus (Fisher, 1942)
- Styloleptus planicollis (Fisher, 1935)
- Styloleptus posticalis (Gahan, 1895)
- Styloleptus rhizophorae Chemsak & Feller, 1988
- Styloleptus scurra (Chevrolat, 1862)
- Styloleptus taino Lingafelter & Micheli, 2004
- Styloleptus thompsoni (Fisher, 1948)
- Styloleptus variabilis (Fisher, 1925)
- Styloleptus zorrillai (Zayas, 1975)
