= Styloleptus nigronotatus =

Scientific classification
- Domain: Eukaryota
- Kingdom: Animalia
- Phylum: Arthropoda
- Class: Insecta
- Order: Coleoptera
- Suborder: Polyphaga
- Infraorder: Cucujiformia
- Family: Cerambycidae
- Genus: Styloleptus
- Species: S. nigronotatus

Binomial name
- Styloleptus nigronotatus (Zayas, 1975)

Species of beetle

Styloleptus nigronotatus is a species of beetle in the family Cerambycidae. It was described by Zayas in 1975.
