= Styloleptus pilosellus =

Scientific classification
- Domain: Eukaryota
- Kingdom: Animalia
- Phylum: Arthropoda
- Class: Insecta
- Order: Coleoptera
- Suborder: Polyphaga
- Infraorder: Cucujiformia
- Family: Cerambycidae
- Genus: Styloleptus
- Species: S. pilosellus

Binomial name
- Styloleptus pilosellus (Fisher, 1942)

Species of beetle

Styloleptus pilosellus is a species of beetle in the family Cerambycidae. It was described by Fisher in 1942.
