= Styloleptus inermis =

Scientific classification
- Domain: Eukaryota
- Kingdom: Animalia
- Phylum: Arthropoda
- Class: Insecta
- Order: Coleoptera
- Suborder: Polyphaga
- Infraorder: Cucujiformia
- Family: Cerambycidae
- Genus: Styloleptus
- Species: S. inermis

Binomial name
- Styloleptus inermis (Fabricius, 1801)

Species of beetle

Styloleptus inermis is a species of beetle in the family Cerambycidae. It was described by Johan Christian Fabricius in 1801.
