= Styloleptus taino =

Scientific classification
- Domain: Eukaryota
- Kingdom: Animalia
- Phylum: Arthropoda
- Class: Insecta
- Order: Coleoptera
- Suborder: Polyphaga
- Infraorder: Cucujiformia
- Family: Cerambycidae
- Genus: Styloleptus
- Species: S. taino

Binomial name
- Styloleptus taino Lingafelter & Micheli, 2004

Species of beetle

Styloleptus taino is a species of beetle in the family Cerambycidae. It was described by Lingafelter and Micheli in 2004.
