= Styloleptus brunneofasciatus =

Scientific classification
- Domain: Eukaryota
- Kingdom: Animalia
- Phylum: Arthropoda
- Class: Insecta
- Order: Coleoptera
- Suborder: Polyphaga
- Infraorder: Cucujiformia
- Family: Cerambycidae
- Genus: Styloleptus
- Species: S. brunneofasciatus

Binomial name
- Styloleptus brunneofasciatus (Fisher, 1935)

Species of beetle

Styloleptus brunneofasciatus is a species of beetle in the family Cerambycidae. It was described by Fisher in 1935.
