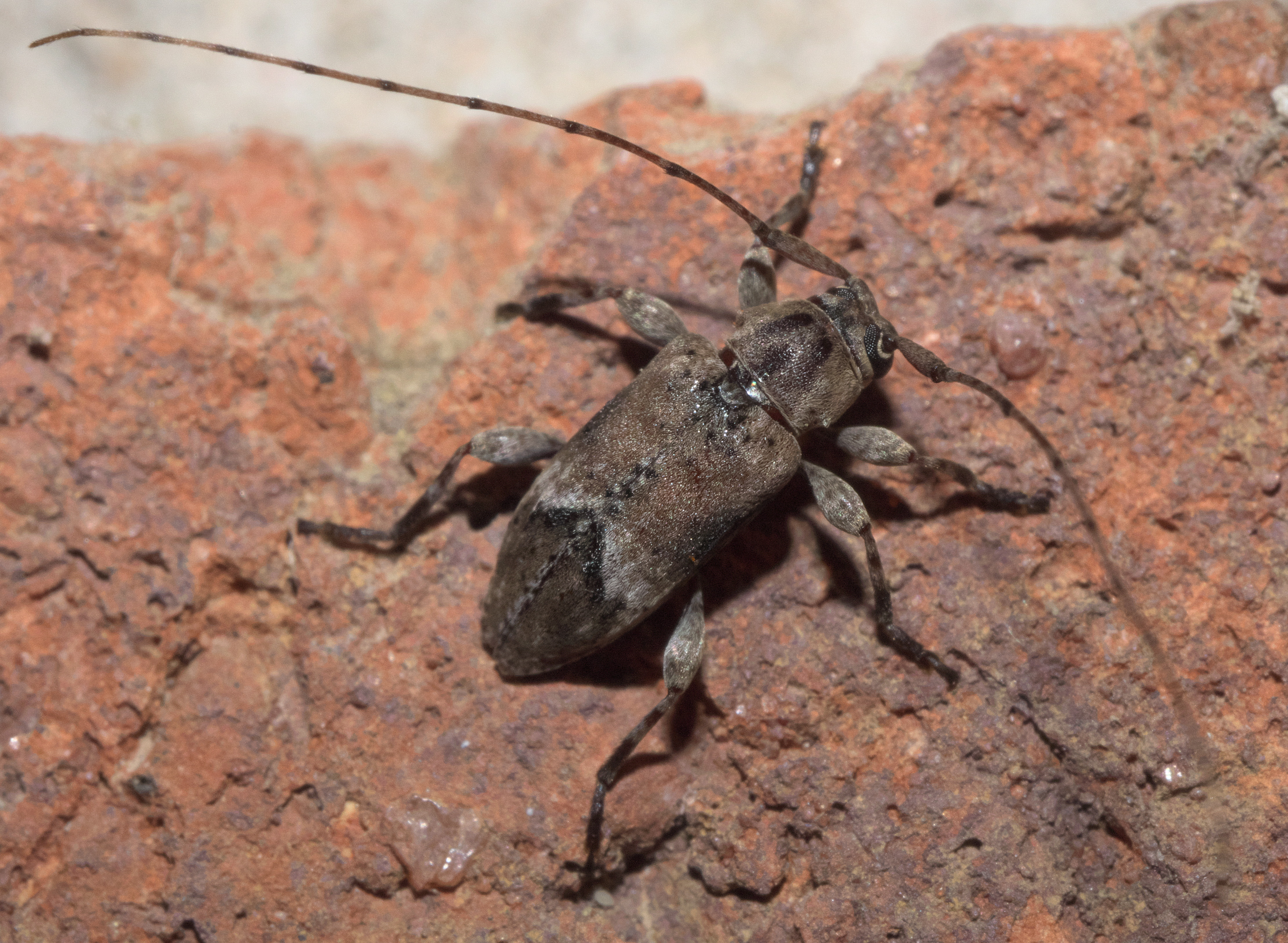

Scientific classification
- Domain: Eukaryota
- Kingdom: Animalia
- Phylum: Arthropoda
- Class: Insecta
- Order: Coleoptera
- Suborder: Polyphaga
- Infraorder: Cucujiformia
- Family: Cerambycidae
- Genus: Styloleptus
- Species: S. biustus

Binomial name
- Styloleptus biustus (LeConte, 1852)

= Styloleptus biustus =

Species of beetle

Styloleptus biustus is a species of beetle in the family Cerambycidae. It was described by John Lawrence LeConte in 1852.
