= Goephanes obliquepictus =

Scientific classification
- Kingdom: Animalia
- Phylum: Arthropoda
- Class: Insecta
- Order: Coleoptera
- Suborder: Polyphaga
- Infraorder: Cucujiformia
- Family: Cerambycidae
- Genus: Goephanes
- Species: G. obliquepictus

Binomial name
- Goephanes obliquepictus (Fairmaire, 1903)

Species of beetle

Goephanes obliquepictus is a species of beetle in the family Cerambycidae. It was first described by Léon Fairmaire in 1903.
