= Goephanes zebrinoides =

Scientific classification
- Kingdom: Animalia
- Phylum: Arthropoda
- Class: Insecta
- Order: Coleoptera
- Suborder: Polyphaga
- Infraorder: Cucujiformia
- Family: Cerambycidae
- Genus: Goephanes
- Species: G. zebrinoides

Binomial name
- Goephanes zebrinoides Breuning, 1970

Species of beetle

Goephanes zebrinoides is a species of beetle in the family Cerambycidae. It was described by Breuning in 1970.
