= Goephanes albosticticus =

Scientific classification
- Kingdom: Animalia
- Phylum: Arthropoda
- Class: Insecta
- Order: Coleoptera
- Suborder: Polyphaga
- Infraorder: Cucujiformia
- Family: Cerambycidae
- Genus: Goephanes
- Species: G. albosticticus

Binomial name
- Goephanes albosticticus Breuning, 1957

Species of beetle

Goephanes albosticticus is a species of beetle in the family Cerambycidae. It was described by Breuning in 1957.
