= Goephanes luctuosus =

Scientific classification
- Kingdom: Animalia
- Phylum: Arthropoda
- Class: Insecta
- Order: Coleoptera
- Suborder: Polyphaga
- Infraorder: Cucujiformia
- Family: Cerambycidae
- Genus: Goephanes
- Species: G. luctuosus

Binomial name
- Goephanes luctuosus Pascoe, 1862

Species of beetle

Goephanes luctuosus is a species of beetle in the family Cerambycidae which is native to Madagascar. It was described by Pascoe in 1862. A public domain drawing can be viewed in the Google books scan of the 1862 edition of the Journal of Entomology.
