= Goephanes bipartitus =

Scientific classification
- Kingdom: Animalia
- Phylum: Arthropoda
- Class: Insecta
- Order: Coleoptera
- Suborder: Polyphaga
- Infraorder: Cucujiformia
- Family: Cerambycidae
- Genus: Goephanes
- Species: G. bipartitus

Binomial name
- Goephanes bipartitus Fairmaire, 1897

Species of beetle

Goephanes bipartitus is a species of beetle in the family Cerambycidae. It was described by Léon Fairmaire in 1897.
