= Goephanes interruptus =

Scientific classification
- Kingdom: Animalia
- Phylum: Arthropoda
- Class: Insecta
- Order: Coleoptera
- Suborder: Polyphaga
- Infraorder: Cucujiformia
- Family: Cerambycidae
- Genus: Goephanes
- Species: G. interruptus

Binomial name
- Goephanes interruptus (Fairmaire, 1902)

Species of beetle

Goephanes interruptus is a species of beetle in the family Cerambycidae. It was described by Fairmaire in 1902.
