= Goephanes =

Scientific classification
- Kingdom: Animalia
- Phylum: Arthropoda
- Class: Insecta
- Order: Coleoptera
- Suborder: Polyphaga
- Infraorder: Cucujiformia
- Family: Cerambycidae
- Tribe: Acanthocinini
- Genus: Goephanes

Genus of beetles

Goephanes is a genus of beetles in the family Cerambycidae, containing the following species:

subgenus Cristogoephanes

- Goephanes biflavomaculatus Breuning, 1957
- Goephanes cristipennis Breuning, 1957
- Goephanes zebrinoides Breuning, 1970
- Goephanes zebrinus (Fairmaire, 1897)

subgenus Goephanes

- Goephanes albolineatipennis Breuning, 1970
- Goephanes albosignatus Breuning, 1965
- Goephanes albosticticus Breuning, 1957
- Goephanes basiflavicornis Breuning, 1966
- Goephanes bipartitus Fairmaire, 1897
- Goephanes comorensis Breuning, 1957
- Goephanes fasciculatus Breuning, 1957
- Goephanes flavovittipennis Breuning, 1966
- Goephanes funereus (Fairmaire, 1902)
- Goephanes fuscipennis Breuning, 1970
- Goephanes fuscipes Breuning, 1957
- Goephanes fuscovariegatus Breuning, 1970
- Goephanes griveaudi Breuning, 1975
- Goephanes humeralis Breuning, 1957
- Goephanes interruptus (Fairmaire, 1902)
- Goephanes luctuosus Pascoe, 1862
- Goephanes mediovittatus Breuning, 1957
- Goephanes mediovittipennis Breuning, 1961
- Goephanes niveoplagiatus Fairmaire, 1894
- Goephanes notabilis (Fairmaire, 1905)
- Goephanes obliquepictus (Fairmaire, 1903)
- Goephanes ochreosticticus Breuning, 1957
- Goephanes olivaceus Breuning, 1938
- Goephanes pacificus (Fairmaire, 1897)
- Goephanes pictidorsis (Fairmaire, 1897)
- Goephanes pictipennis Breuning, 1961
- Goephanes pictoides Breuning, 1970
- Goephanes pictus Fairmaire, 1896
- Goephanes ralaisalamai Breuning, 1964
- Goephanes rufescens Breuning, 1938
- Goephanes rufoflavus Breuning, 1970
- Goephanes vadoni Breuning, 1970
- Goephanes varicolor Breuning, 1961
- Goephanes viettei Breuning, 1975
- Goephanes virgulifer Fairmaire, 1897
