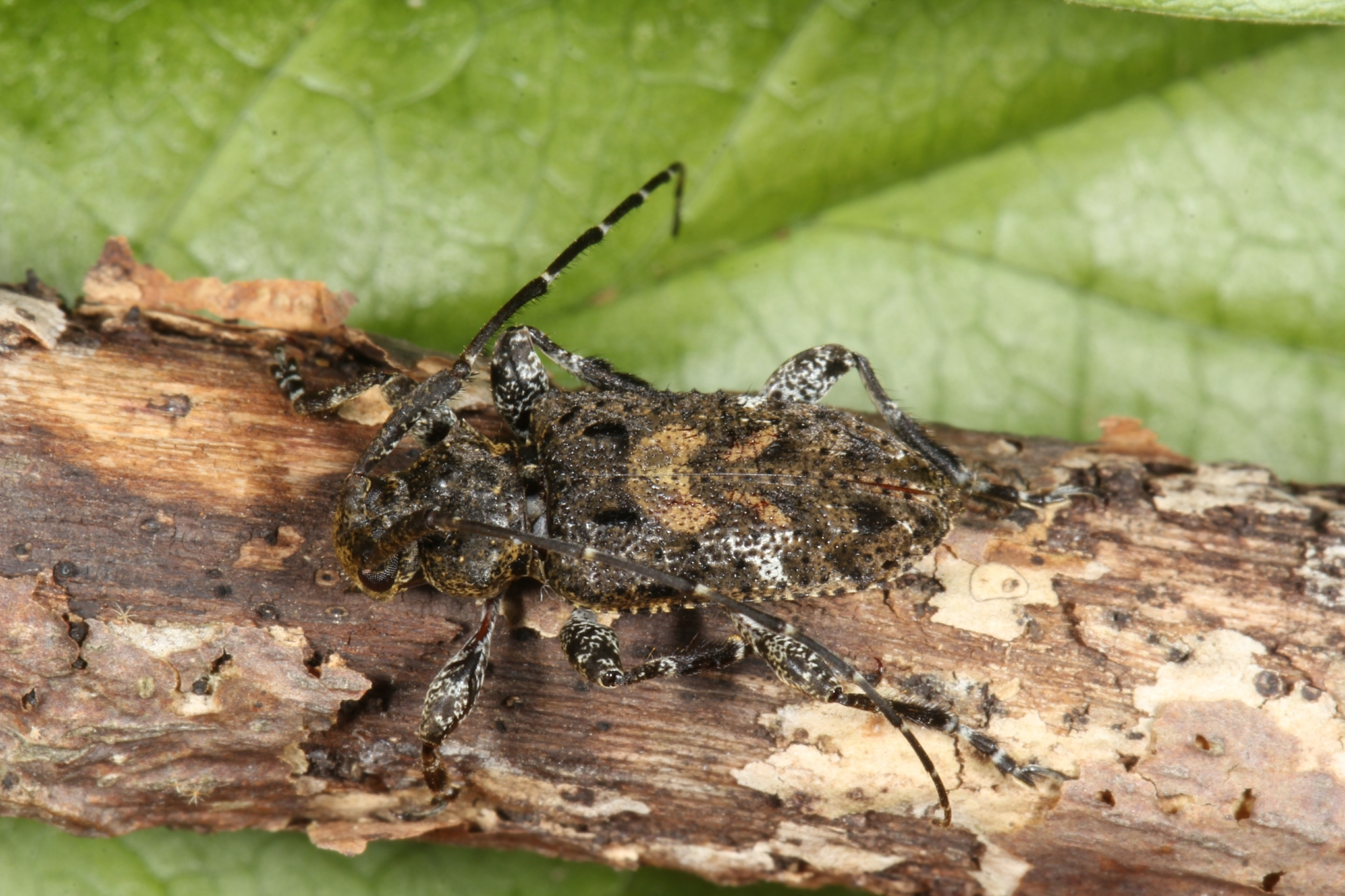
- Leptocometes barbiscapus

Scientific classification
- Kingdom: Animalia
- Phylum: Arthropoda
- Class: Insecta
- Order: Coleoptera
- Suborder: Polyphaga
- Infraorder: Cucujiformia
- Family: Cerambycidae
- Subfamily: Lamiinae
- Genus: Leptocometes

= Leptocometes =

Genus of beetles

Leptocometes is a genus of beetles in the family Cerambycidae, containing the following species:

- Leptocometes acutispinis (Bates, 1863)
- Leptocometes barbiscapus (Bates, 1872)
- Leptocometes hispidus Bates, 1881
- Leptocometes luneli (Chalumeau & Touroult, 2005)
- Leptocometes nubilus (Melzer, 1934)
- Leptocometes obscurus (Monné, 1990)
- Leptocometes pallidus (Melzer, 1934)
- Leptocometes penicillatus (Monné, 1990)
- Leptocometes spinipennis (Bates, 1885)
- Leptocometes spitzi (Melzer, 1934)
- Leptocometes umbrosus (Thomson, 1864)
- Leptocometes virescens (Melzer, 1931)
- Leptocometes volxemi (Lameere, 1884)
- Leptocometes zikani (Martins & Monné, 1974)
