= Leptocometes spinipennis =

Scientific classification
- Kingdom: Animalia
- Phylum: Arthropoda
- Class: Insecta
- Order: Coleoptera
- Suborder: Polyphaga
- Infraorder: Cucujiformia
- Family: Cerambycidae
- Genus: Leptocometes
- Species: L. spinipennis

Binomial name
- Leptocometes spinipennis (Bates, 1885)

Species of beetle

Leptocometes spinipennis is a species of beetle in the family Cerambycidae. It was described by Bates in 1885.
