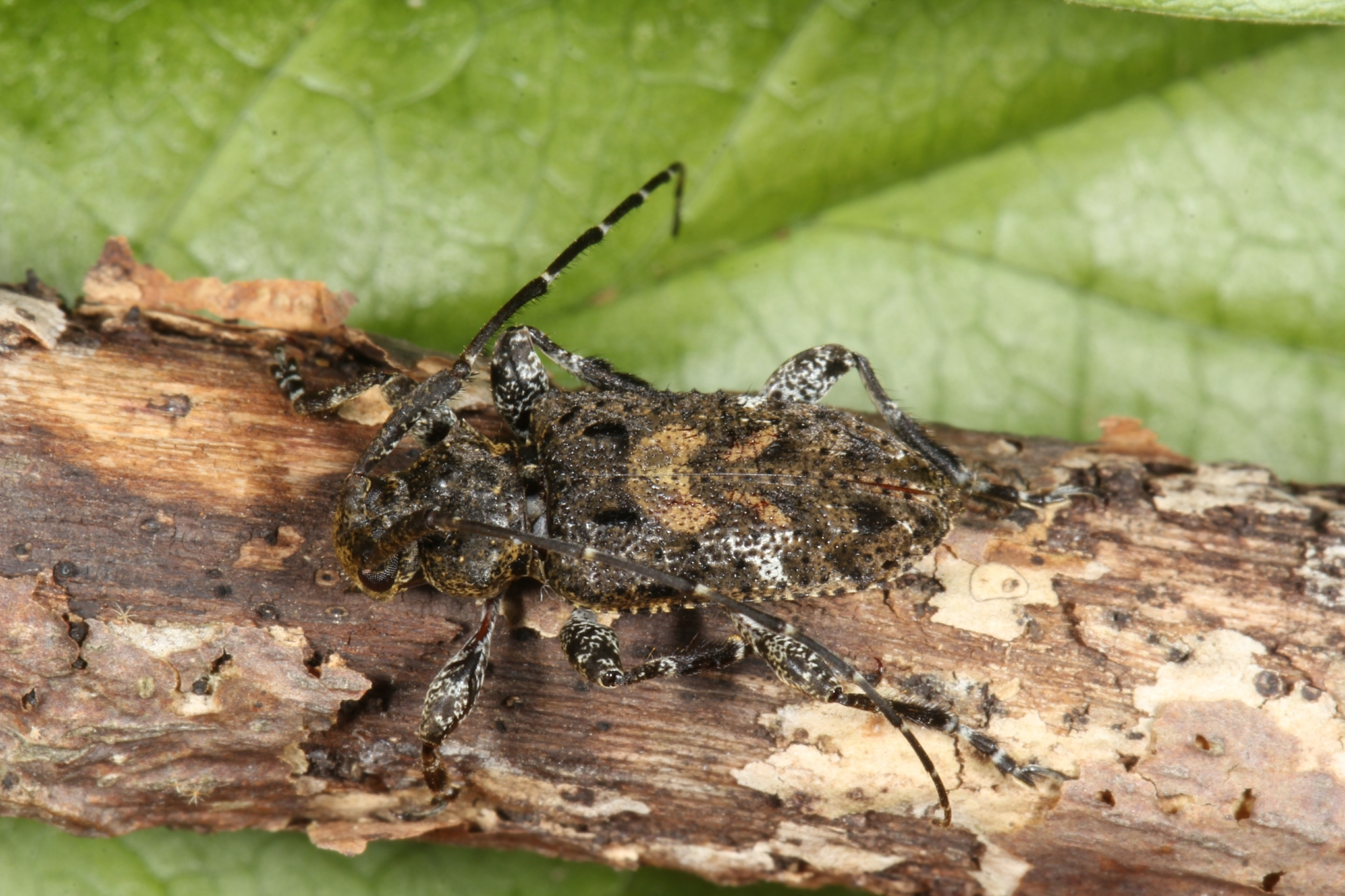

Scientific classification
- Kingdom: Animalia
- Phylum: Arthropoda
- Class: Insecta
- Order: Coleoptera
- Suborder: Polyphaga
- Infraorder: Cucujiformia
- Family: Cerambycidae
- Genus: Leptocometes
- Species: L. barbiscapus

Binomial name
- Leptocometes barbiscapus (Bates, 1872)

= Leptocometes barbiscapus =

Species of beetle

Leptocometes barbiscapus is a species of beetle in the family Cerambycidae. It was described by Bates in 1872.
