= Leptocometes obscurus =

Scientific classification
- Kingdom: Animalia
- Phylum: Arthropoda
- Class: Insecta
- Order: Coleoptera
- Suborder: Polyphaga
- Infraorder: Cucujiformia
- Family: Cerambycidae
- Genus: Leptocometes
- Species: L. obscurus

Binomial name
- Leptocometes obscurus (Monné, 1990)

Species of beetle

Leptocometes obscurus is a species of beetle in the family Cerambycidae. It was described by Monné in 1990.
