= Leptocometes umbrosus =

Scientific classification
- Kingdom: Animalia
- Phylum: Arthropoda
- Class: Insecta
- Order: Coleoptera
- Suborder: Polyphaga
- Infraorder: Cucujiformia
- Family: Cerambycidae
- Genus: Leptocometes
- Species: L. umbrosus

Binomial name
- Leptocometes umbrosus (Thomson, 1864)

Species of beetle

Leptocometes umbrosus is a species of beetle in the family Cerambycidae. It was described by Thomson in 1864.
