= Leptocometes hispidus =

Scientific classification
- Kingdom: Animalia
- Phylum: Arthropoda
- Clade: Pancrustacea
- Class: Insecta
- Order: Coleoptera
- Suborder: Polyphaga
- Infraorder: Cucujiformia
- Family: Cerambycidae
- Genus: Leptocometes
- Species: L. hispidus

Binomial name
- Leptocometes hispidus Bates, 1881

Species of beetle

Leptocometes hispidus is a species of beetle in the family Cerambycidae. It was described by Bates in 1881.
