= Leptocometes luneli =

Scientific classification
- Kingdom: Animalia
- Phylum: Arthropoda
- Class: Insecta
- Order: Coleoptera
- Suborder: Polyphaga
- Infraorder: Cucujiformia
- Family: Cerambycidae
- Genus: Leptocometes
- Species: L. luneli

Binomial name
- Leptocometes luneli (Chalumeau & Touroult, 2005)

Species of beetle

Leptocometes luneli is a species of beetle in the family Cerambycidae. It was described by Chalumeau and Touroult in 2005.
