= Leptocometes acutispinis =

Scientific classification
- Kingdom: Animalia
- Phylum: Arthropoda
- Class: Insecta
- Order: Coleoptera
- Suborder: Polyphaga
- Infraorder: Cucujiformia
- Family: Cerambycidae
- Genus: Leptocometes
- Species: L. acutispinis

Binomial name
- Leptocometes acutispinis (Bates, 1863)

Species of beetle

Leptocometes acutispinis is a species of beetle in the family Cerambycidae. It was described by Henry Walter Bates in 1863.
