= Leptocometes volxemi =

Scientific classification
- Kingdom: Animalia
- Phylum: Arthropoda
- Class: Insecta
- Order: Coleoptera
- Suborder: Polyphaga
- Infraorder: Cucujiformia
- Family: Cerambycidae
- Genus: Leptocometes
- Species: L. volxemi

Binomial name
- Leptocometes volxemi (Lameere, 1884)

Species of beetle

Leptocometes volxemi is a species of beetle in the family Cerambycidae. It was described by Lameere in 1884.
