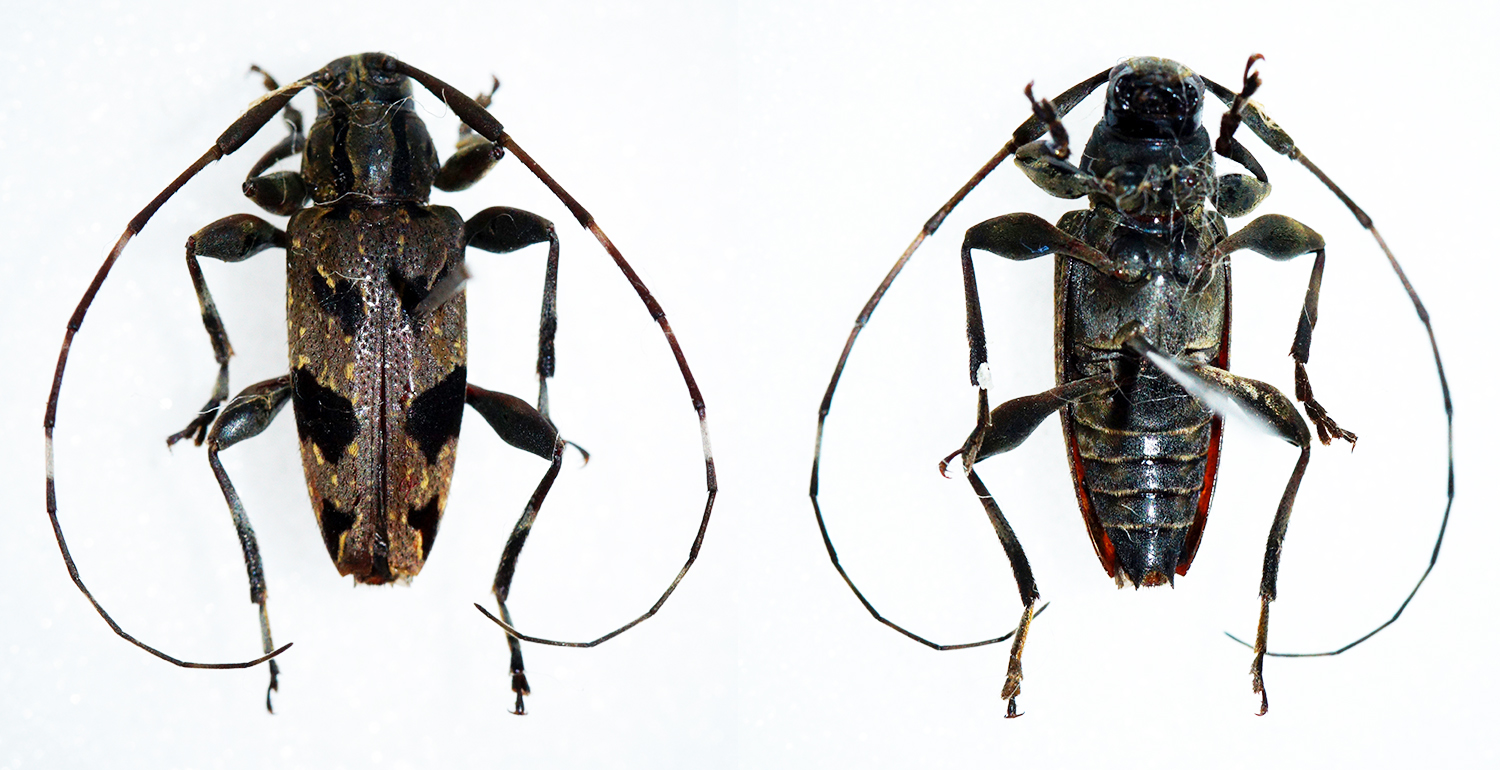

Scientific classification
- Kingdom: Animalia
- Phylum: Arthropoda
- Clade: Pancrustacea
- Class: Insecta
- Order: Coleoptera
- Suborder: Polyphaga
- Infraorder: Cucujiformia
- Family: Cerambycidae
- Genus: Sporetus
- Species: S. colobotheides

Binomial name
- Sporetus colobotheides (White, 1855)

= Sporetus colobotheides =

Species of beetle

Sporetus colobotheides is a species of beetle in the family Cerambycidae. It was described by White in 1855. It is found in Brazil (Mato Grosso, Bahia, Minas Gerais, Espírito Santo, Rio de Janeiro, São Paulo, Paraná, Santa Catarina, Rio Grande do Sul), Paraguay and Argentina (Misiones).
