= Sporetus guttulus =

Scientific classification
- Kingdom: Animalia
- Phylum: Arthropoda
- Class: Insecta
- Order: Coleoptera
- Suborder: Polyphaga
- Infraorder: Cucujiformia
- Family: Cerambycidae
- Genus: Sporetus
- Species: S. guttulus

Binomial name
- Sporetus guttulus (Bates, 1864)

Species of beetle

Sporetus guttulus is a species of beetle in the family Cerambycidae. It was described by Henry Walter Bates in 1864.
