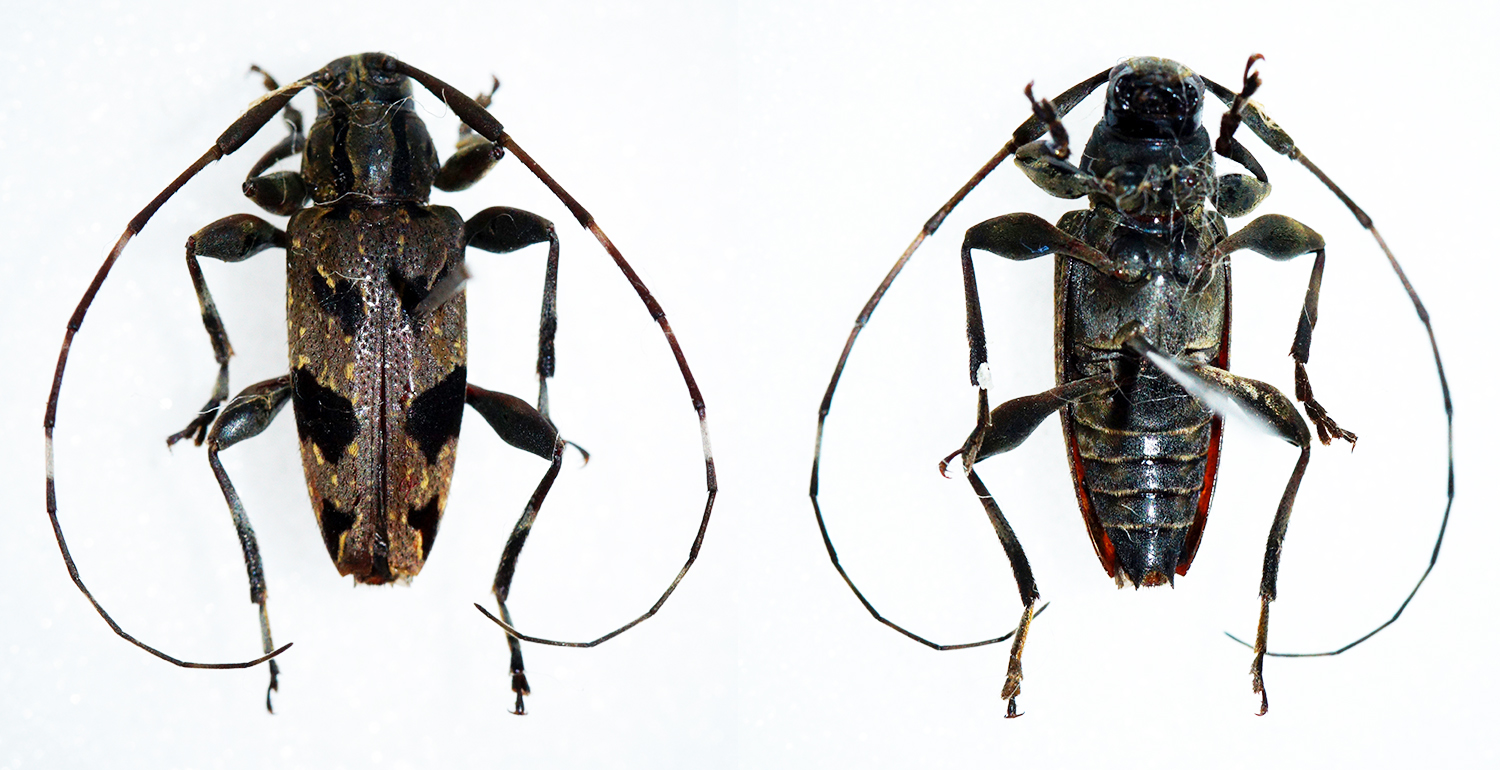
- Sex: Male Size: 11.5mm

Scientific classification
- Kingdom: Animalia
- Phylum: Arthropoda
- Class: Insecta
- Order: Coleoptera
- Suborder: Polyphaga
- Infraorder: Cucujiformia
- Family: Cerambycidae
- Tribe: Acanthocinini
- Genus: Sporetus

= Sporetus =

Genus of beetles

Sporetus is a genus of beetles in the family Cerambycidae, containing the following species:

- Sporetus abstrusus Melzer, 1935
- Sporetus bellus Monné, 1976
- Sporetus colobotheides (White, 1855)
- Sporetus decipiens Bates, 1866
- Sporetus distinctus Monné, 1976
- Sporetus fasciatus Martins & Monné, 1974
- Sporetus guttulus (Bates, 1864)
- Sporetus inexpectatus Monné, 1998
- Sporetus porcinus Bates, 1864
- Sporetus probatioides Bates, 1864
- Sporetus seminalis Bates, 1864
- Sporetus variolosus Monné, 1998
- Sporetus venustus Monné, 1998
