= Sporetus inexpectatus =

Scientific classification
- Kingdom: Animalia
- Phylum: Arthropoda
- Class: Insecta
- Order: Coleoptera
- Suborder: Polyphaga
- Infraorder: Cucujiformia
- Family: Cerambycidae
- Genus: Sporetus
- Species: S. inexpectatus

Binomial name
- Sporetus inexpectatus Monné, 1998

Species of beetle

Sporetus inexpectatus is a species of beetle in the family Cerambycidae. It was described by Monné in 1998.
