= Sporetus decipiens =

Scientific classification
- Kingdom: Animalia
- Phylum: Arthropoda
- Class: Insecta
- Order: Coleoptera
- Suborder: Polyphaga
- Infraorder: Cucujiformia
- Family: Cerambycidae
- Genus: Sporetus
- Species: S. decipiens

Binomial name
- Sporetus decipiens Bates, 1866

Species of beetle

Sporetus decipiens is a species of beetle in the family Cerambycidae. It was described by Henry Walter Bates in 1866.
