= Sporetus abstrusus =

Scientific classification
- Kingdom: Animalia
- Phylum: Arthropoda
- Class: Insecta
- Order: Coleoptera
- Suborder: Polyphaga
- Infraorder: Cucujiformia
- Family: Cerambycidae
- Genus: Sporetus
- Species: S. abstrusus

Binomial name
- Sporetus abstrusus Melzer, 1935

Species of beetle

Sporetus abstrusus is a species of beetle in the family Cerambycidae. It was described by Melzer in 1935.
