= Sporetus fasciatus =

Scientific classification
- Kingdom: Animalia
- Phylum: Arthropoda
- Class: Insecta
- Order: Coleoptera
- Suborder: Polyphaga
- Infraorder: Cucujiformia
- Family: Cerambycidae
- Genus: Sporetus
- Species: S. fasciatus

Binomial name
- Sporetus fasciatus Martins & Monné, 1974

Species of beetle

Sporetus fasciatus is a species of beetle in the family Cerambycidae. It was described by Martins and Monné in 1974.
