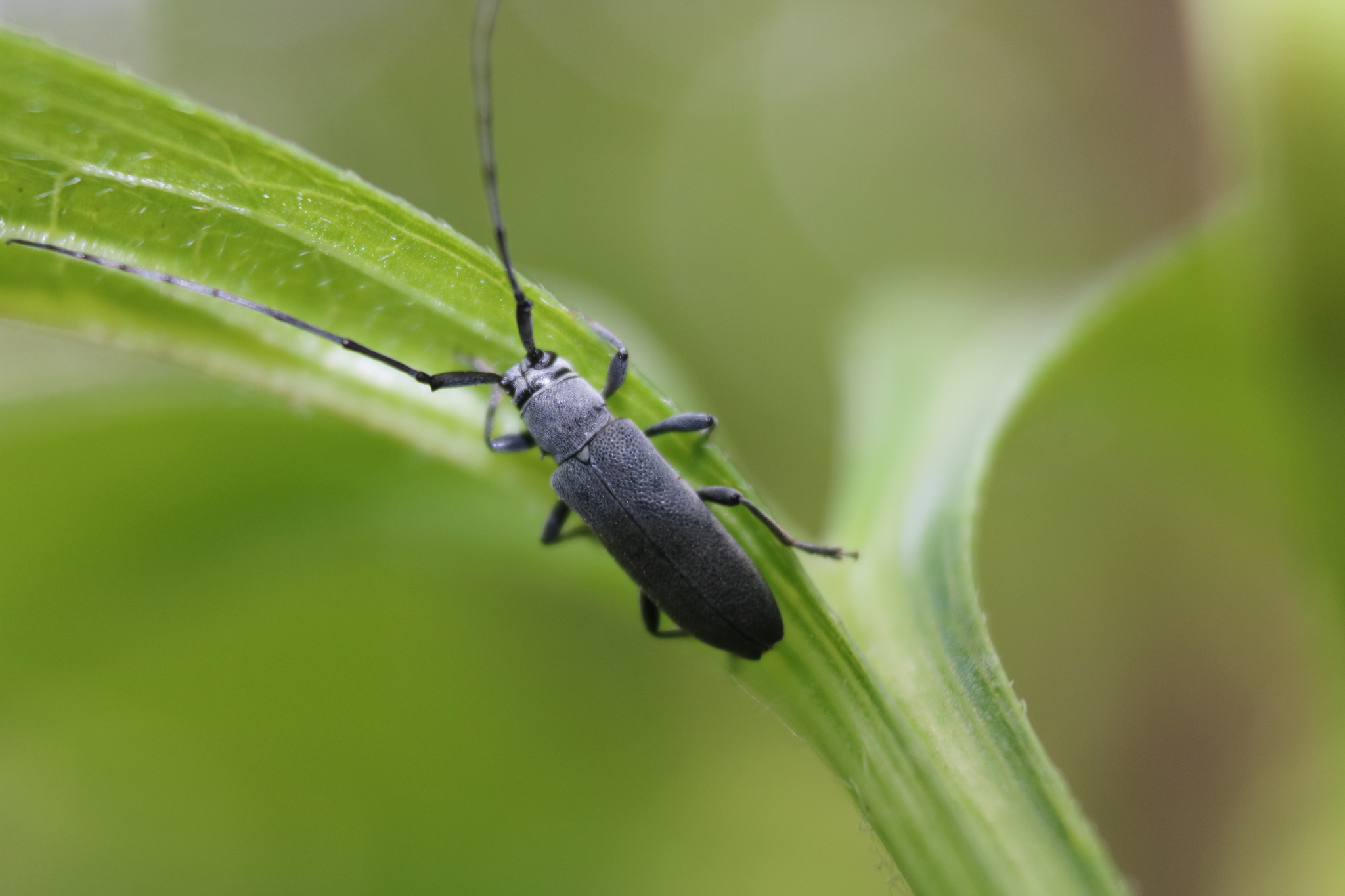

Scientific classification
- Kingdom: Animalia
- Phylum: Arthropoda
- Clade: Pancrustacea
- Class: Insecta
- Order: Coleoptera
- Suborder: Polyphaga
- Infraorder: Cucujiformia
- Family: Cerambycidae
- Genus: Dectes
- Species: D. sayi

Binomial name
- Dectes sayi Dillon & Dillon, 1953

= Dectes sayi =

Species of beetle

Dectes sayi is a species of longhorn beetles of the subfamily Lamiinae. It was described by Dillon and Dillon in 1953.
