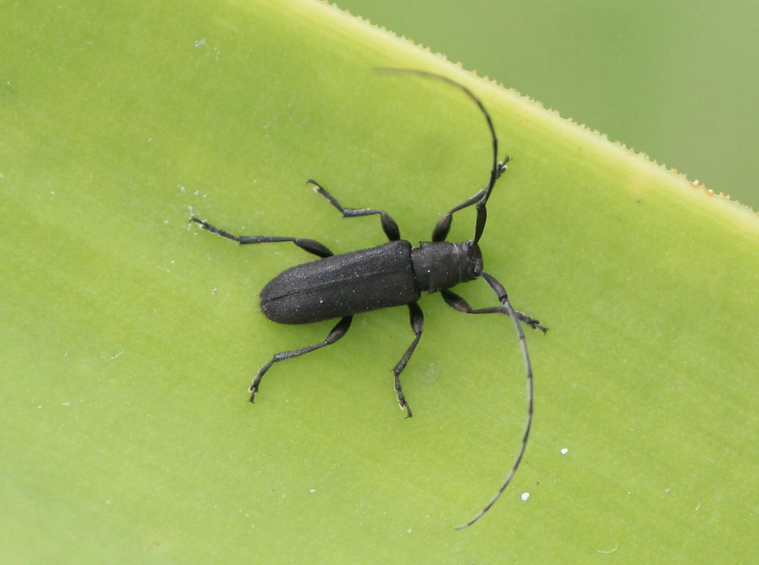

Scientific classification
- Kingdom: Animalia
- Phylum: Arthropoda
- Class: Insecta
- Order: Coleoptera
- Suborder: Polyphaga
- Infraorder: Cucujiformia
- Family: Cerambycidae
- Genus: Dectes
- Species: D. nigripilus

Binomial name
- Dectes nigripilus Chemsak & Linsley, 1986

= Dectes nigripilus =

Species of beetle

Dectes nigripilus is a species of longhorn beetles of the subfamily Lamiinae. It was described by Chemsak and Linsley in 1986, and is known from central Mexico.
