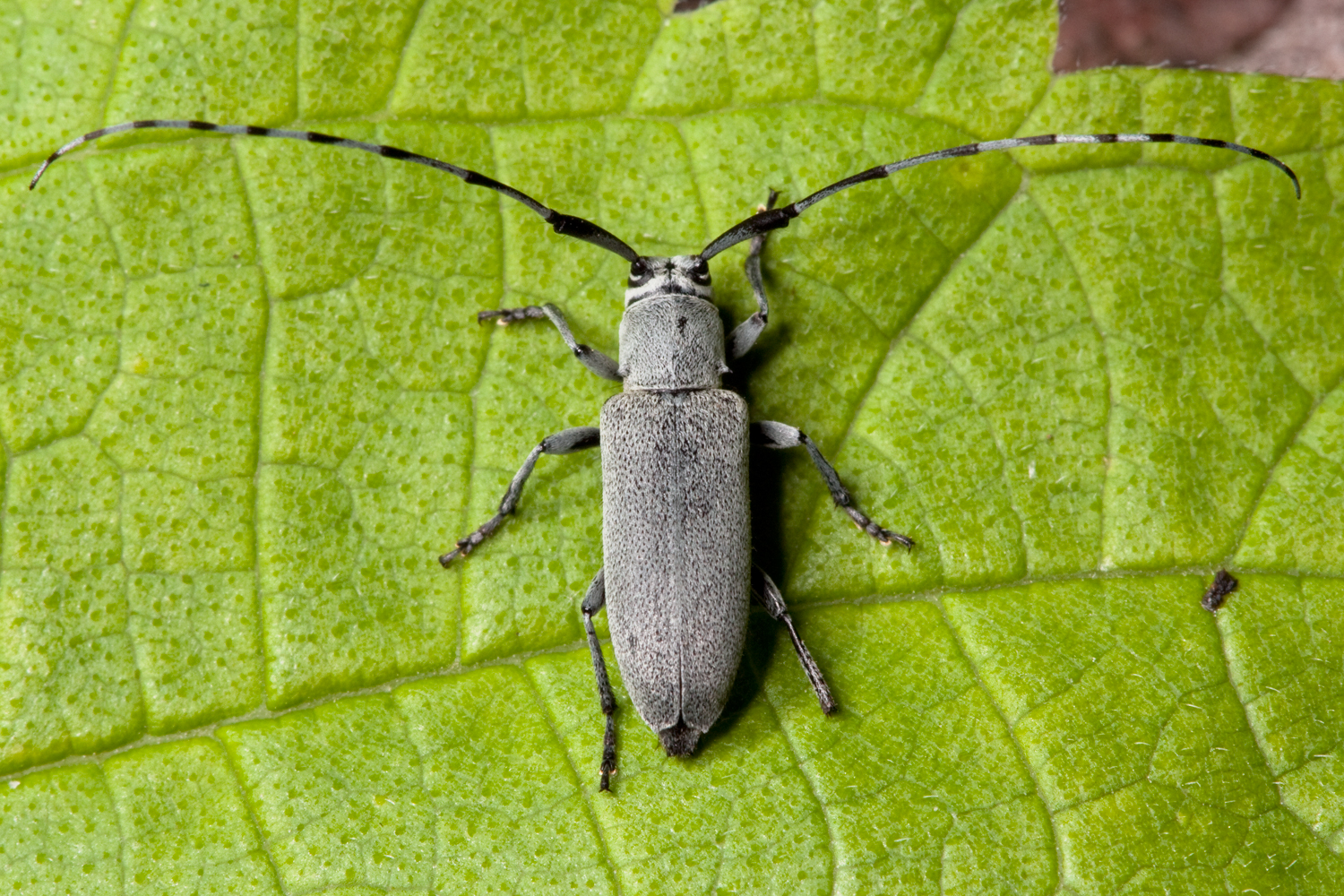

Scientific classification
- Kingdom: Animalia
- Phylum: Arthropoda
- Class: Insecta
- Order: Coleoptera
- Suborder: Polyphaga
- Infraorder: Cucujiformia
- Family: Cerambycidae
- Tribe: Acanthocinini
- Genus: Dectes; LeConte, 1852

= Dectes =

Genus of beetles

Dectes is a genus of longhorn beetles of the subfamily Lamiinae. It was described by John Lawrence LeConte in 1852.

== Species ==
- Dectes nigripilus Chemsak & Linsley, 1986
- Dectes sayi Dillon and Dillon, 1953
- Dectes texanus LeConte, 1862
