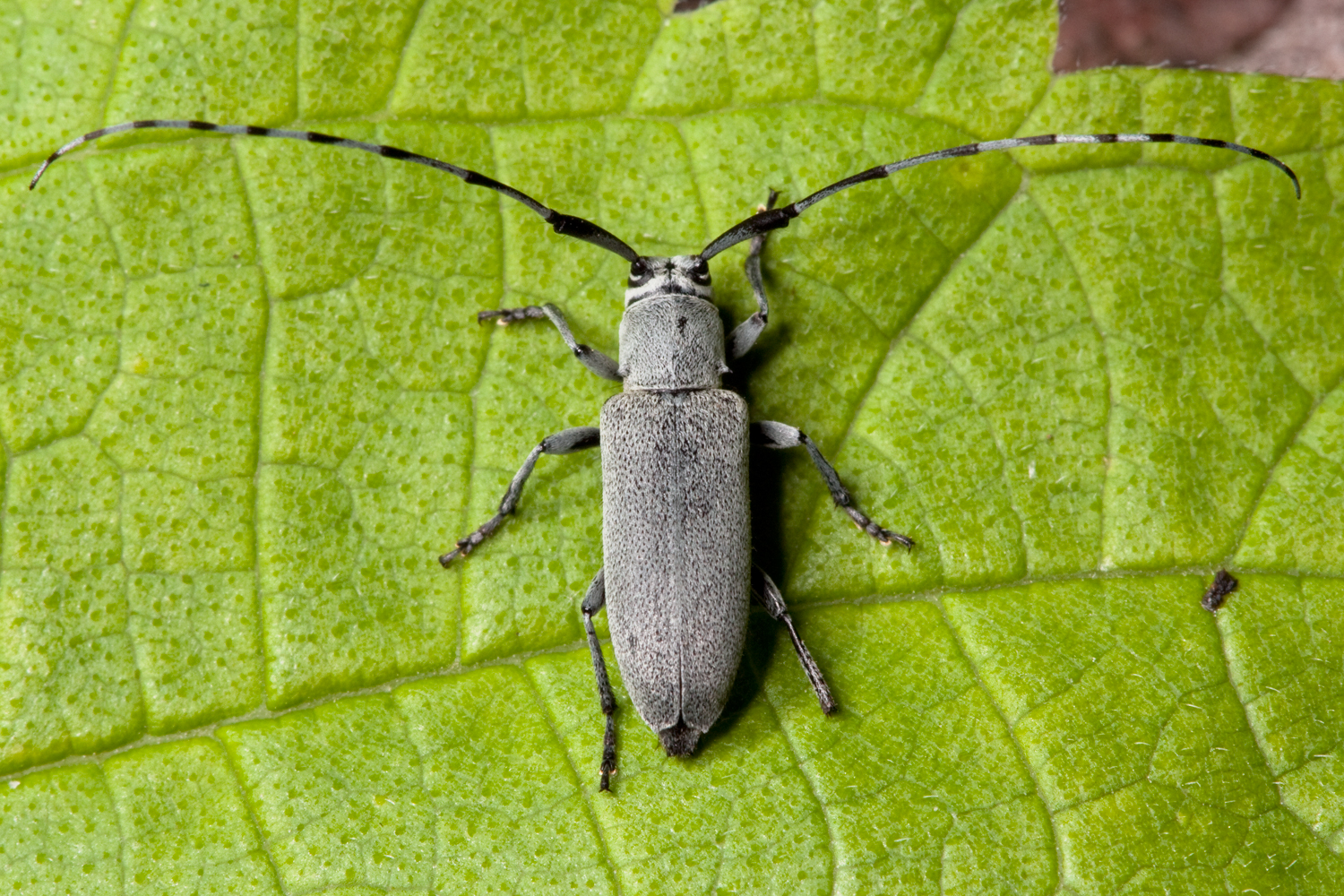

Scientific classification
- Kingdom: Animalia
- Phylum: Arthropoda
- Class: Insecta
- Order: Coleoptera
- Suborder: Polyphaga
- Infraorder: Cucujiformia
- Family: Cerambycidae
- Genus: Dectes
- Species: D. texanus

Binomial name
- Dectes texanus LeConte, 1862

= Dectes texanus =

Species of beetle

Dectes texanus is a species of longhorn beetle of the subfamily Lamiinae. It was described by John Lawrence LeConte in 1862.
