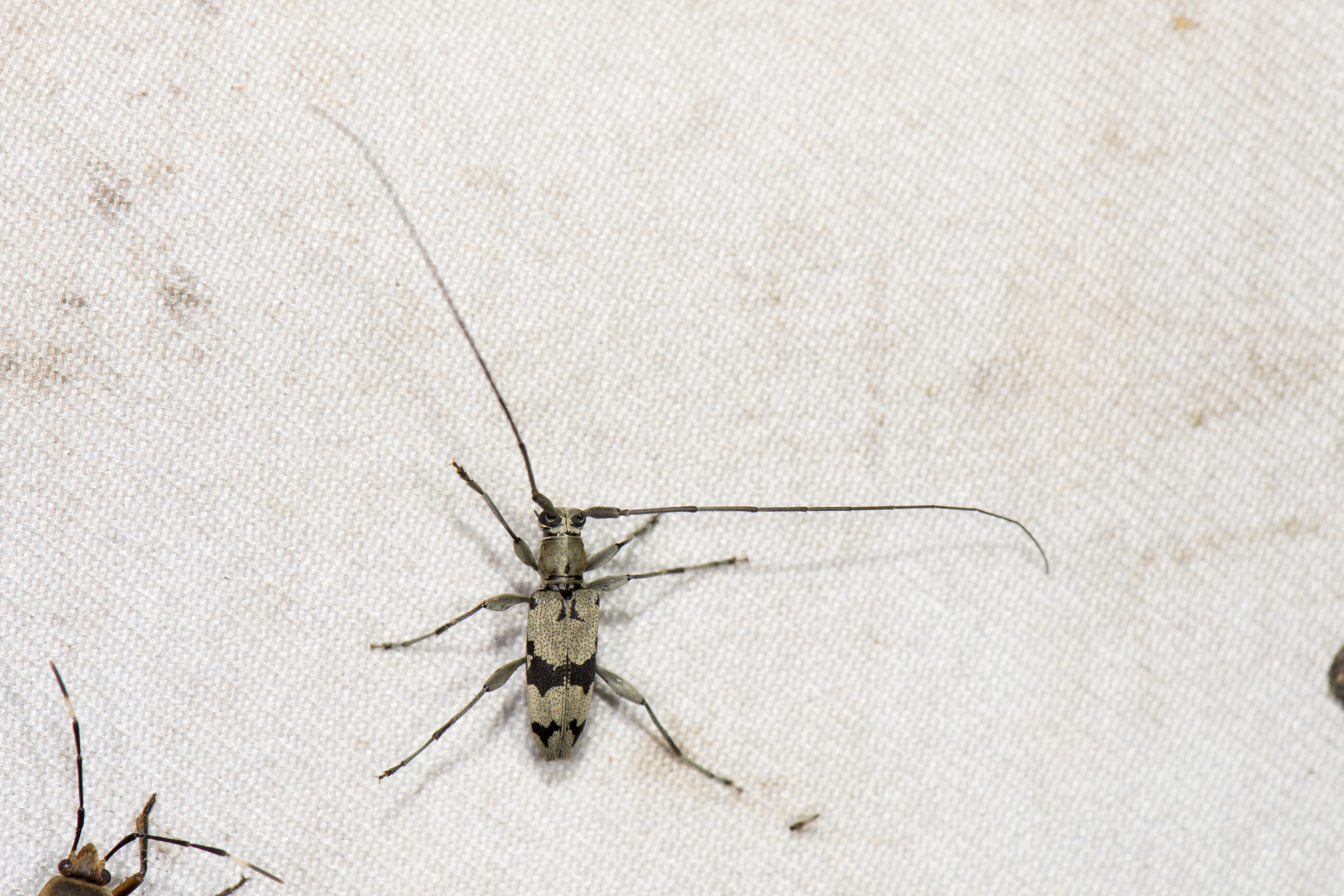

Scientific classification
- Kingdom: Animalia
- Phylum: Arthropoda
- Class: Insecta
- Order: Coleoptera
- Suborder: Polyphaga
- Infraorder: Cucujiformia
- Family: Cerambycidae
- Genus: Eoporis
- Species: E. bifasciana

Binomial name
- Eoporis bifasciana Schwarzer, 1925

= Eoporis bifasciana =

Species of beetle

Eoporis bifasciana is a species of beetle in the family Cerambycidae. It was described by Schwarzer in 1925.
