= Eoporis mitonoi =

Scientific classification
- Kingdom: Animalia
- Phylum: Arthropoda
- Class: Insecta
- Order: Coleoptera
- Suborder: Polyphaga
- Infraorder: Cucujiformia
- Family: Cerambycidae
- Genus: Eoporis
- Species: E. mitonoi

Binomial name
- Eoporis mitonoi (Seki, 1946)

Species of beetle

Eoporis mitonoi is a species of beetle in the family Cerambycidae. It was described by Seki in 1946.
