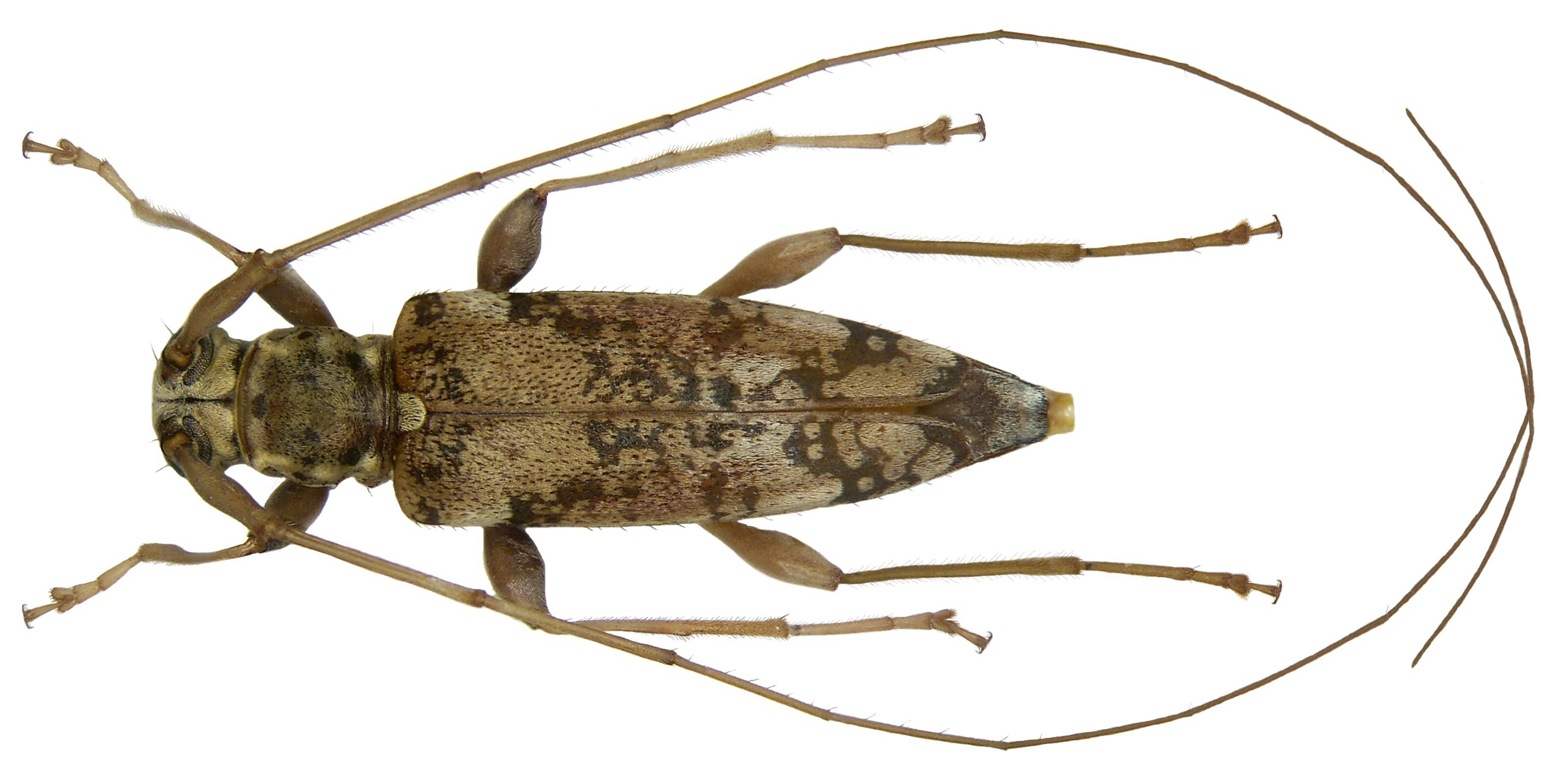
- Eoporis elegans

Scientific classification
- Kingdom: Animalia
- Phylum: Arthropoda
- Class: Insecta
- Order: Coleoptera
- Suborder: Polyphaga
- Infraorder: Cucujiformia
- Family: Cerambycidae
- Subfamily: Lamiinae
- Tribe: Acanthocinini
- Genus: Eoporis; Pascoe, 1864

= Eoporis =

Genus of beetles

Eoporis is a genus of beetles in the family Cerambycidae, containing the following species:

subgenus Eoporimimus

- Eoporis bifasciana Schwarzer, 1925
- Eoporis differens Pic, 1926
- Eoporis mitonoi (Seki, 1946)
- Eoporis pedongensis Breuning, 1969

subgenus Eoporis

- Eoporis elegans Pascoe, 1864
