= Eoporis differens =

Scientific classification
- Kingdom: Animalia
- Phylum: Arthropoda
- Class: Insecta
- Order: Coleoptera
- Suborder: Polyphaga
- Infraorder: Cucujiformia
- Family: Cerambycidae
- Genus: Eoporis
- Species: E. differens

Binomial name
- Eoporis differens Pic, 1926

Species of beetle

Eoporis differens is a species of beetle in the family Cerambycidae. It was described by Pic in 1926. The species belongs to the subfamily Lamiinae and is known to occur in Myanmar (Burma) and Thailand (Chao Phraya River Basin).

The taxonomic description of Eoporis differens was published in the Bulletin de la Société Entomologique de France by Maurice Pic in 1926.
