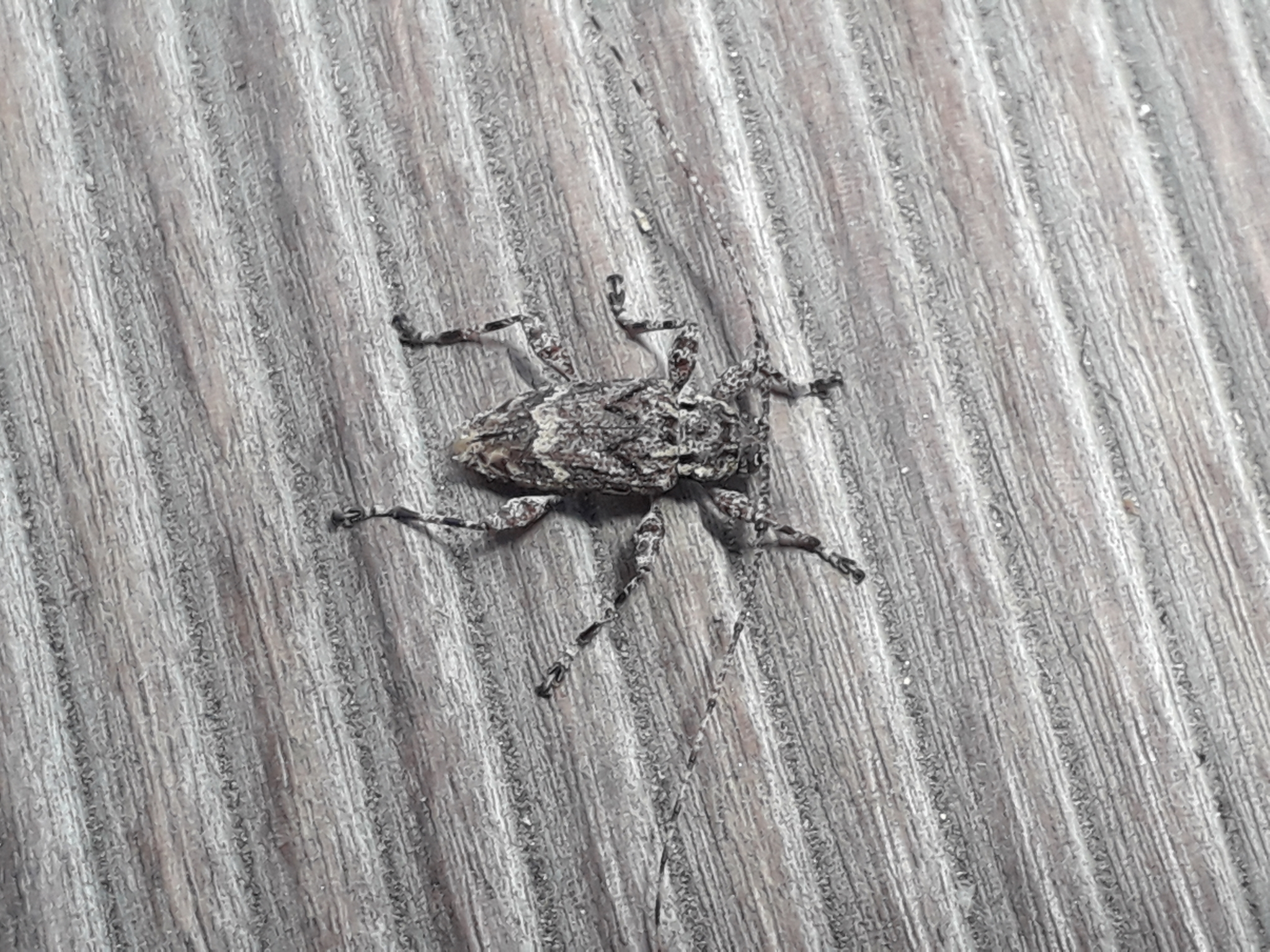

Scientific classification
- Kingdom: Animalia
- Phylum: Arthropoda
- Class: Insecta
- Order: Coleoptera
- Suborder: Polyphaga
- Infraorder: Cucujiformia
- Family: Cerambycidae
- Genus: Amniscus
- Species: A. assimilis

Binomial name
- Amniscus assimilis (Gahan, 1895)

= Amniscus assimilis =

Species of beetle

Amniscus assimilis is a species of longhorn beetles of the subfamily Lamiinae, and the only species in the genus Amniscus. It was described by Gahan in 1895.
