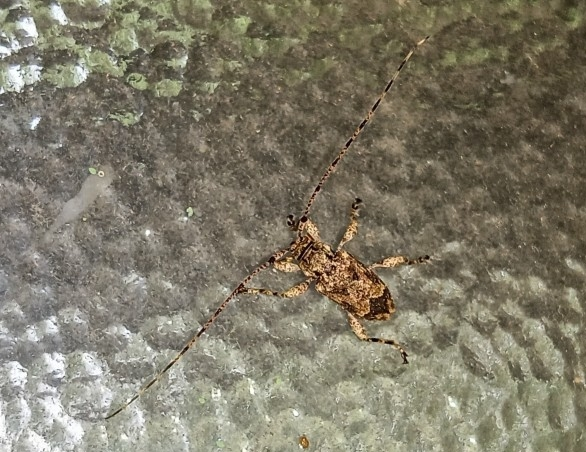

Scientific classification
- Kingdom: Animalia
- Phylum: Arthropoda
- Class: Insecta
- Order: Coleoptera
- Suborder: Polyphaga
- Infraorder: Cucujiformia
- Family: Cerambycidae
- Genus: Amniscus
- Species: A. similis

Binomial name
- Amniscus similis (Gahan, 1895)

= Amniscus similis =

Species of beetle

Amniscus similis is a species of longhorn beetles of the subfamily Lamiinae. It was described by Gahan in 1895, and is known from Lesser Antilles and Barbados in the West Indies, and Puerto Rico.
