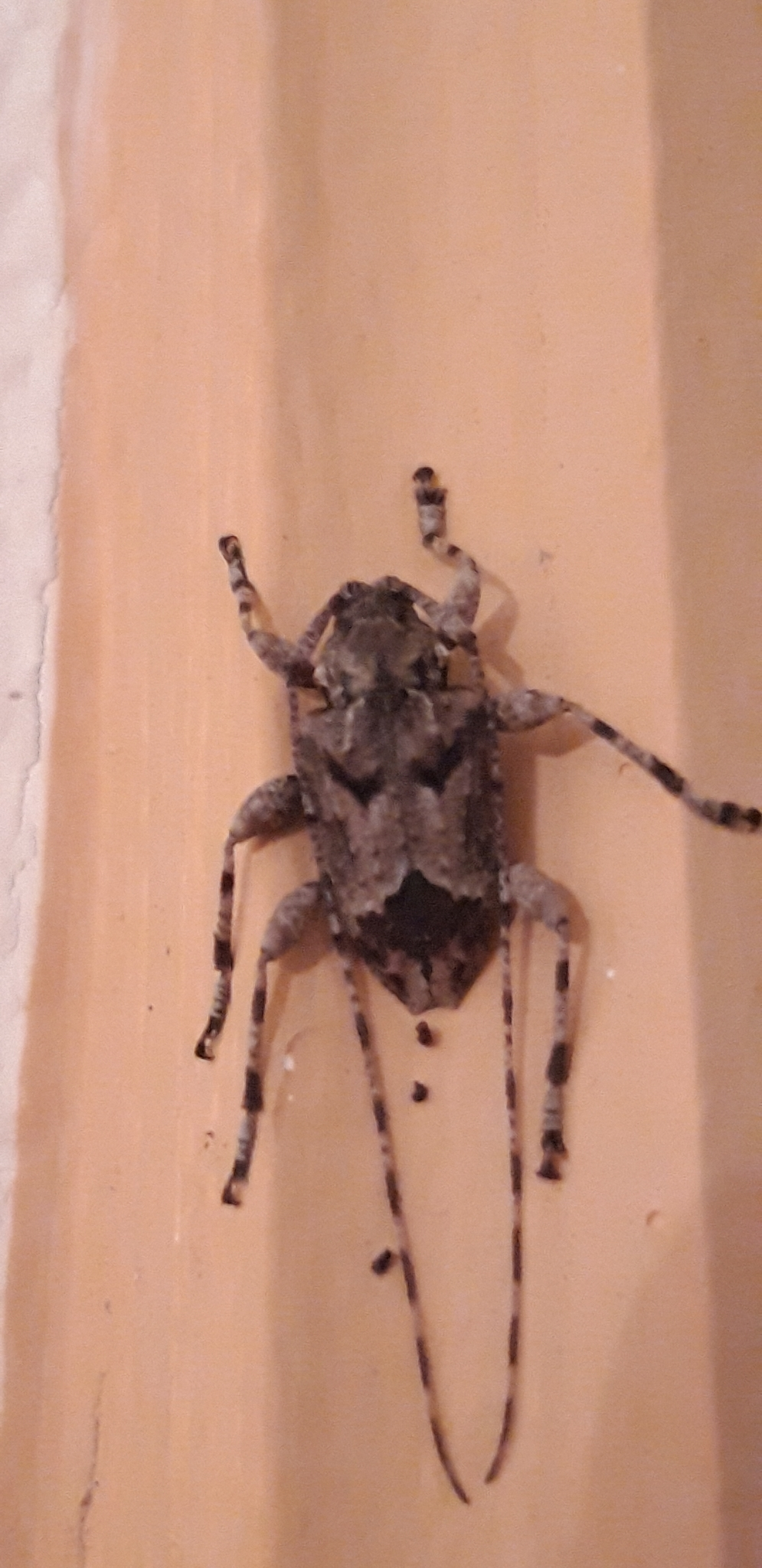

Scientific classification
- Kingdom: Animalia
- Phylum: Arthropoda
- Class: Insecta
- Order: Coleoptera
- Suborder: Polyphaga
- Infraorder: Cucujiformia
- Family: Cerambycidae
- Genus: Amniscus
- Species: A. praemorsus

Binomial name
- Amniscus praemorsus (Fabricius, 1792)

= Amniscus praemorsus =

Species of beetle

Amniscus praemorsus is a species of longhorn beetle of the subfamily Lamiinae. It was described by Johan Christian Fabricius in 1792 and is known from Mexico and the West Indies.
