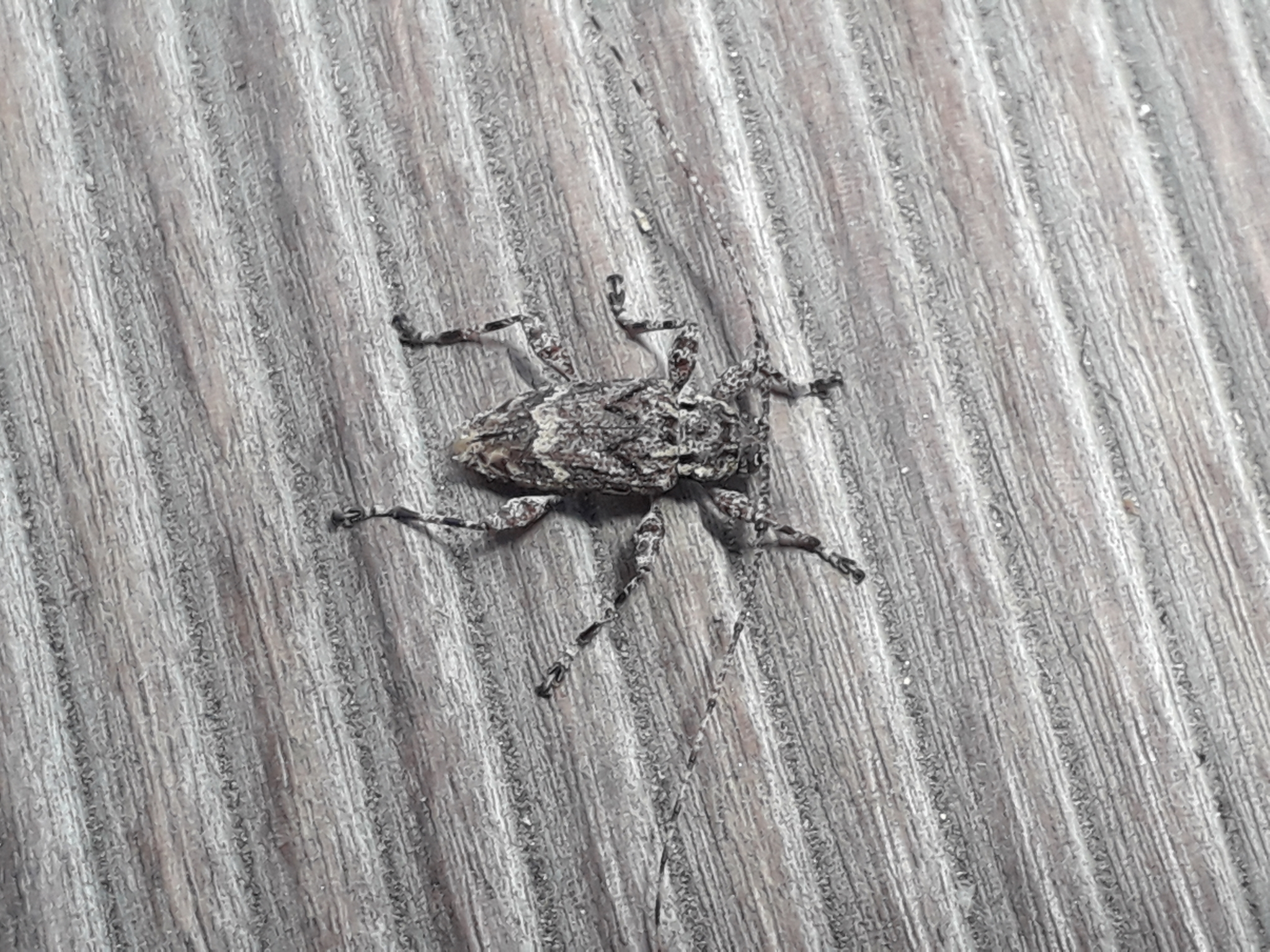
- Amniscus assimilis

Scientific classification
- Kingdom: Animalia
- Phylum: Arthropoda
- Class: Insecta
- Order: Coleoptera
- Suborder: Polyphaga
- Infraorder: Cucujiformia
- Family: Cerambycidae
- Tribe: Acanthocinini
- Genus: Amniscus

= Amniscus =

Genus of beetles

Amniscus is a genus of beetles in the family Cerambycidae, containing the following species:

- Amniscus assimilis (Gahan, 1895)
- Amniscus praemorsus (Fabricius, 1792)
- Amniscus similis (Gahan, 1895)
