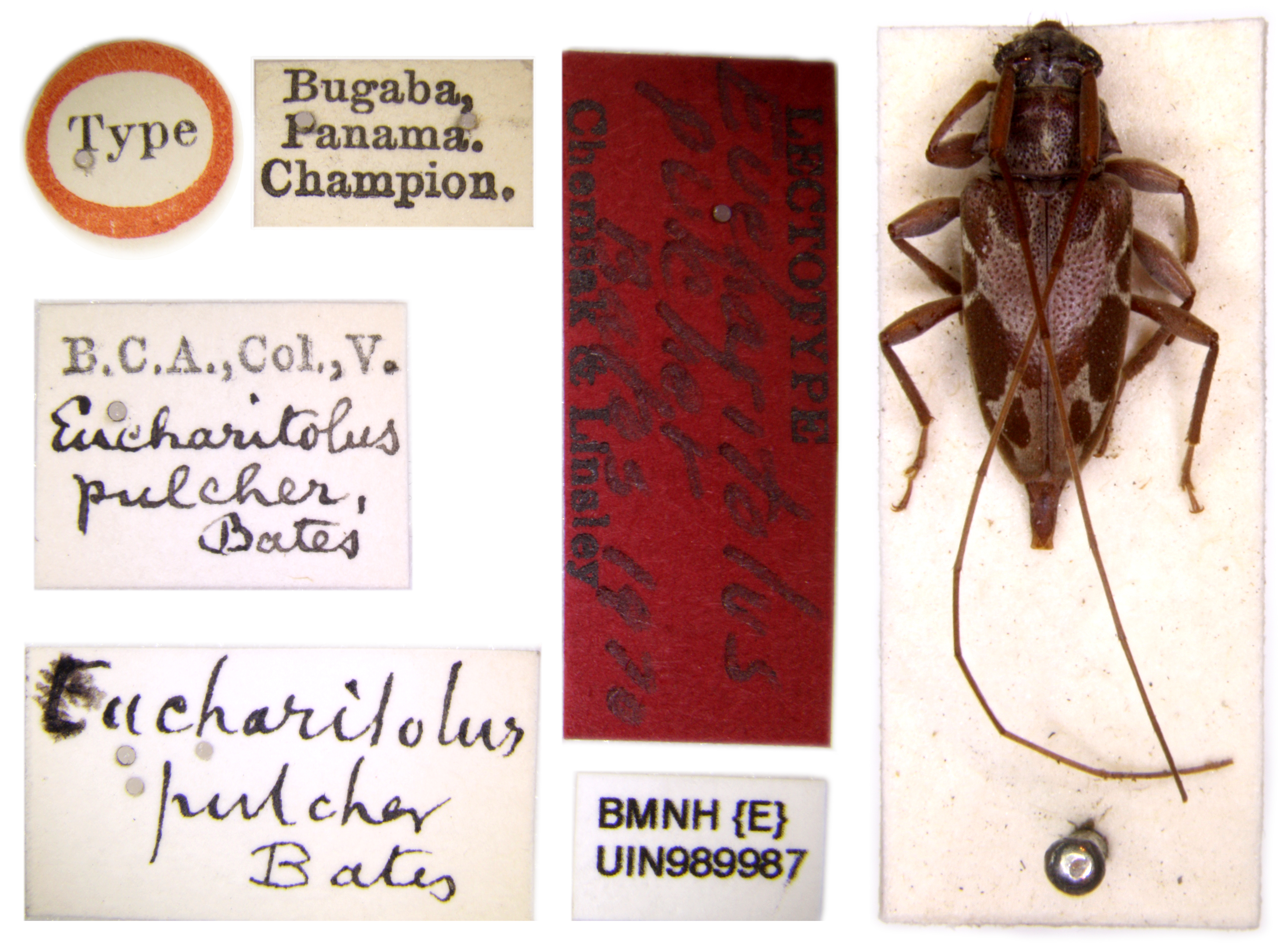

Scientific classification
- Domain: Eukaryota
- Kingdom: Animalia
- Phylum: Arthropoda
- Class: Insecta
- Order: Coleoptera
- Suborder: Polyphaga
- Infraorder: Cucujiformia
- Family: Cerambycidae
- Genus: Eucharitolus
- Species: E. pulcher

Binomial name
- Eucharitolus pulcher Bates, 1885

= Eucharitolus pulcher =

Species of beetle

Eucharitolus pulcher is a species of longhorn beetles of the subfamily Lamiinae. It was described by Henry Walter Bates in 1885, and is known from Guatemala and Panama.
