= Eucharitolus geometricus =

Scientific classification
- Kingdom: Animalia
- Phylum: Arthropoda
- Class: Insecta
- Order: Coleoptera
- Suborder: Polyphaga
- Infraorder: Cucujiformia
- Family: Cerambycidae
- Genus: Eucharitolus
- Species: E. geometricus

Binomial name
- Eucharitolus geometricus (Tippmann, 1960)

Species of beetle

Eucharitolus geometricus is a species of longhorn beetles of the subfamily Lamiinae. It was described by Tippmann in 1960, and is known from Bolivia.
