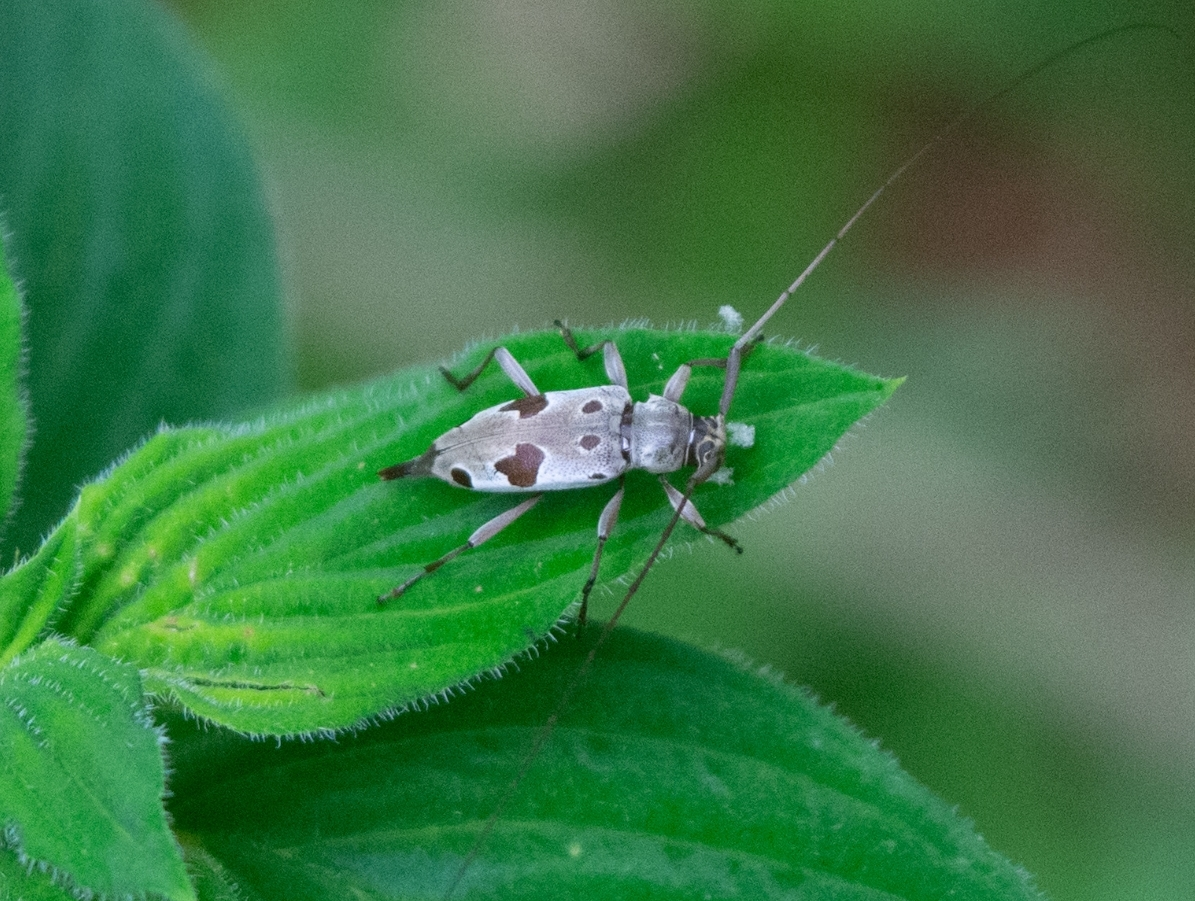

Scientific classification
- Kingdom: Animalia
- Phylum: Arthropoda
- Class: Insecta
- Order: Coleoptera
- Suborder: Polyphaga
- Infraorder: Cucujiformia
- Family: Cerambycidae
- Genus: Eucharitolus
- Species: E. bellus

Binomial name
- Eucharitolus bellus (Melzer, 1927)

= Eucharitolus bellus =

Species of beetle

Eucharitolus bellus is a species of longhorn beetles of the subfamily Lamiinae. It was described by Melzer in 1927, and is known from southeastern Brazil.
