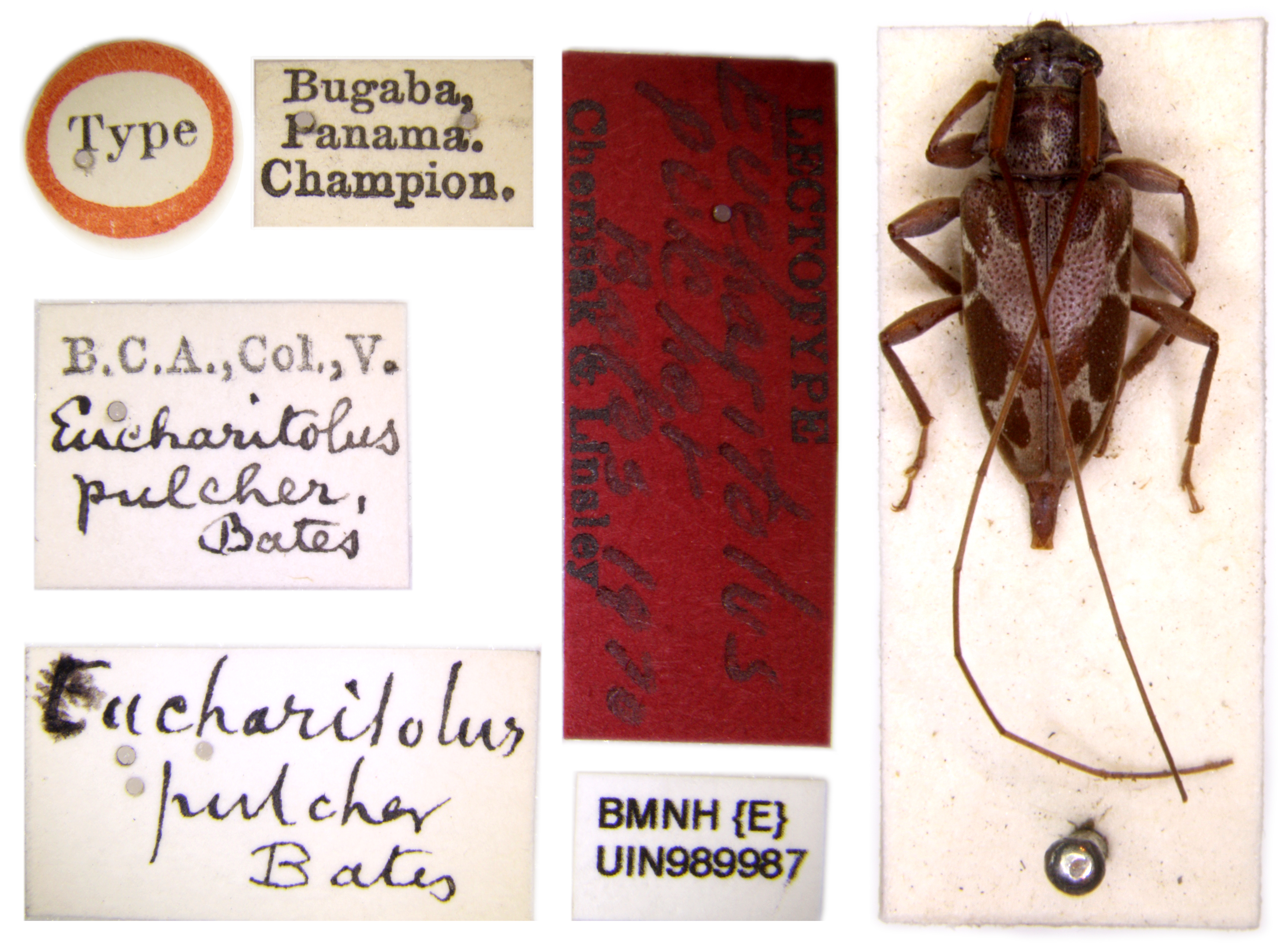
- Eucharitolus pulcher

Scientific classification
- Domain: Eukaryota
- Kingdom: Animalia
- Phylum: Arthropoda
- Class: Insecta
- Order: Coleoptera
- Suborder: Polyphaga
- Infraorder: Cucujiformia
- Family: Cerambycidae
- Subfamily: Lamiinae
- Tribe: Acanthocinini
- Genus: Eucharitolus; Bates, 1885

Type species
- Eucharitolus pulcher Bates, 1885

= Eucharitolus =

Genus of beetles

Eucharitolus is a genus of beetles in the family Cerambycidae, containing the following species:

- Eucharitolus bellus (Melzer, 1927)
- Eucharitolus depressus Botero & Monne, 2012
- Eucharitolus dorcadioides (White, 1855)
- Eucharitolus geometricus (Tippmann, 1960)
- Eucharitolus lecossoisi Audureau & Demez, 2015
- Eucharitolus lituratus (Melzer, 1934)
- Eucharitolus longus Botero & Monne, 2012
- Eucharitolus pulcher Bates, 1885
- Eucharitolus spilotus Botero & Monne, 2012
