= Baryssinus huedepohli =

Scientific classification
- Domain: Eukaryota
- Kingdom: Animalia
- Phylum: Arthropoda
- Class: Insecta
- Order: Coleoptera
- Suborder: Polyphaga
- Infraorder: Cucujiformia
- Family: Cerambycidae
- Genus: Baryssinus
- Species: B. huedepohli

Binomial name
- Baryssinus huedepohli Monné & Martins, 1976

Species of beetle

Baryssinus huedepohli is a species of longhorn beetle in the family Cerambycidae. It was described by Monné & Martins in 1976. Baryssinus huedepohli is a small to medium-sized beetle, ranging in length from 11 to 17 mm. It is black or brown in color, with white or yellow markings on the head, pronotum, and elytra. The antennae are long and slender, and the legs are relatively short.

Baryssinus huedepohli is a nocturnal beetle that feeds on the leaves of various plants, including species of Annonaceae, Bignoniaceae, and Rubiaceae. The larvae of the beetle develop in dead wood.

Baryssinus huedepohli is not considered to be a pest, but it can be found in agricultural areas. It is also a popular insect among collectors.
