= Baryssinus marisae =

Scientific classification
- Kingdom: Animalia
- Phylum: Arthropoda
- Clade: Pancrustacea
- Class: Insecta
- Order: Coleoptera
- Suborder: Polyphaga
- Infraorder: Cucujiformia
- Family: Cerambycidae
- Genus: Baryssinus
- Species: B. marisae

Binomial name
- Baryssinus marisae Martins & Monné, 1974

Species of beetle

Baryssinus marisae is a species of longhorn beetle in the family Cerambycidae. It was described by Martins & Monné in 1974. It is found in Brazil (Bahia, Minas Gerais, Espírito Santo, Rio de Janeiro, São Paulo, Paraná, Santa Catarina, Rio Grande do Sul) and Argentina (Misiones).
