= Baryssinus =

Scientific classification
- Domain: Eukaryota
- Kingdom: Animalia
- Phylum: Arthropoda
- Class: Insecta
- Order: Coleoptera
- Suborder: Polyphaga
- Infraorder: Cucujiformia
- Family: Cerambycidae
- Tribe: Acanthocinini
- Genus: Baryssinus

Genus of beetles

Baryssinus is a genus of beetles in the family Cerambycidae, containing the following species:

- Baryssinus albifrons Monné & Martins, 1976
- Baryssinus bicirrifer Bates, 1872
- Baryssinus bilineatus Bates, 1864
- Baryssinus chemsaki Monné, 1985
- Baryssinus giesberti Monne & Monne, 2007
- Baryssinus huedepohli Monné & Martins, 1976
- Baryssinus marcelae Martins & Monné, 1974
- Baryssinus marisae Martins & Monné, 1974
- Baryssinus melasmus Monné & Martins, 1976
- Baryssinus mimus Monne & Monne, 2007
- Baryssinus modestus Monné, 1985
- Baryssinus penicillatus Bates, 1864
- Baryssinus robertoi Monné & Martins, 1976
- Baryssinus silviae Martins & Monné, 1974
