= Baryssinus robertoi =

Scientific classification
- Domain: Eukaryota
- Kingdom: Animalia
- Phylum: Arthropoda
- Class: Insecta
- Order: Coleoptera
- Suborder: Polyphaga
- Infraorder: Cucujiformia
- Family: Cerambycidae
- Genus: Baryssinus
- Species: B. robertoi

Binomial name
- Baryssinus robertoi Monné & Martins, 1976

Species of beetle

Baryssinus robertoi is a species of longhorn beetle in the family Cerambycidae. It was described by Monné & Martins in 1976.
