= Baryssinus albifrons =

Scientific classification
- Domain: Eukaryota
- Kingdom: Animalia
- Phylum: Arthropoda
- Class: Insecta
- Order: Coleoptera
- Suborder: Polyphaga
- Infraorder: Cucujiformia
- Family: Cerambycidae
- Genus: Baryssinus
- Species: B. albifrons

Binomial name
- Baryssinus albifrons Monné & Martins, 1976

Species of beetle

Baryssinus albifrons is a species of longhorn beetle in the family Cerambycidae. It was described by Monné & Martins in 1976.
