= Baryssinus mimus =

Scientific classification
- Domain: Eukaryota
- Kingdom: Animalia
- Phylum: Arthropoda
- Class: Insecta
- Order: Coleoptera
- Suborder: Polyphaga
- Infraorder: Cucujiformia
- Family: Cerambycidae
- Genus: Baryssinus
- Species: B. mimus

Binomial name
- Baryssinus mimus Monné & Martins, 2007

Species of beetle

Baryssinus mimus is a species of longhorn beetle in the family Cerambycidae. It was described by Monné & Martins in 2007.
