= Stenolis vigintiguttata =

Scientific classification
- Kingdom: Animalia
- Phylum: Arthropoda
- Class: Insecta
- Order: Coleoptera
- Suborder: Polyphaga
- Infraorder: Cucujiformia
- Family: Cerambycidae
- Genus: Stenolis
- Species: S. vigintiguttata

Binomial name
- Stenolis vigintiguttata (Bates, 1885)

Species of beetle

Stenolis vigintiguttata is a species of beetle in the family Cerambycidae. It was described by Henry Walter Bates in 1885.
