= Stenolis nearnsi =

Scientific classification
- Kingdom: Animalia
- Phylum: Arthropoda
- Class: Insecta
- Order: Coleoptera
- Suborder: Polyphaga
- Infraorder: Cucujiformia
- Family: Cerambycidae
- Genus: Stenolis
- Species: S. nearnsi

Binomial name
- Stenolis nearnsi Monne, 2011

Species of beetle

Stenolis nearnsi is a species of beetle in the family Cerambycidae. It was described by Monne in 2011.
