= Stenolis =

Scientific classification
- Kingdom: Animalia
- Phylum: Arthropoda
- Class: Insecta
- Order: Coleoptera
- Suborder: Polyphaga
- Infraorder: Cucujiformia
- Family: Cerambycidae
- Tribe: Acanthocinini
- Genus: Stenolis

Genus of beetles

Stenolis is a genus of beetles in the family Cerambycidae, containing the following species:

- Stenolis angulata (Fabricius, 1801)
- Stenolis calligramma (Bates, 1872)
- Stenolis flavoguttata Monne, 2011
- Stenolis giesberti Monne, 2011
- Stenolis gilvolineata Monne, 2011
- Stenolis inclusa (Bates, 1885)
- Stenolis laetifica (Bates, 1872)
- Stenolis marcelae Monne, 2011
- Stenolis multimacula Monne, 2011
- Stenolis nearnsi Monne, 2011
- Stenolis polygramma (Bates, 1872)
- Stenolis polytaenia (Bates, 1885)
- Stenolis pulverea (Bates, 1881)
- Stenolis tavakiliani Monne, 2011
- Stenolis theobromae (Lara & Shenefelt, 1964)
- Stenolis vigintiguttata (Bates, 1885)
- Stenolis xanthostigma Monne, 2011
