= Stenolis flavoguttata =

Scientific classification
- Kingdom: Animalia
- Phylum: Arthropoda
- Class: Insecta
- Order: Coleoptera
- Suborder: Polyphaga
- Infraorder: Cucujiformia
- Family: Cerambycidae
- Genus: Stenolis
- Species: S. flavoguttata

Binomial name
- Stenolis flavoguttata Monne, 2011

Species of beetle

Stenolis flavoguttata is a species of beetle in the family Cerambycidae. It was described by Monne in 2011.
