= Stenolis polytaenia =

Scientific classification
- Kingdom: Animalia
- Phylum: Arthropoda
- Class: Insecta
- Order: Coleoptera
- Suborder: Polyphaga
- Infraorder: Cucujiformia
- Family: Cerambycidae
- Genus: Stenolis
- Species: S. polytaenia

Binomial name
- Stenolis polytaenia (Bates, 1885)

Species of beetle

Stenolis polytaenia is a species of beetle in the family Cerambycidae. It was described by Bates in 1885.
