= Stenolis polygramma =

Scientific classification
- Kingdom: Animalia
- Phylum: Arthropoda
- Class: Insecta
- Order: Coleoptera
- Suborder: Polyphaga
- Infraorder: Cucujiformia
- Family: Cerambycidae
- Genus: Stenolis
- Species: S. polygramma

Binomial name
- Stenolis polygramma (Bates, 1872)

Species of beetle

Stenolis polygramma is a species of beetle in the family Cerambycidae. It was described by Bates in 1872.
