= Stenolis theobromae =

Scientific classification
- Kingdom: Animalia
- Phylum: Arthropoda
- Class: Insecta
- Order: Coleoptera
- Suborder: Polyphaga
- Infraorder: Cucujiformia
- Family: Cerambycidae
- Genus: Stenolis
- Species: S. theobromae

Binomial name
- Stenolis theobromae (Lara & Shenefelt, 1964)

Species of beetle

Stenolis theobromae is a species of beetle in the family Cerambycidae. It was described by Lara and Shenefelt in 1964.
