= Stenolis angulata =

Scientific classification
- Kingdom: Animalia
- Phylum: Arthropoda
- Class: Insecta
- Order: Coleoptera
- Suborder: Polyphaga
- Infraorder: Cucujiformia
- Family: Cerambycidae
- Genus: Stenolis
- Species: S. angulata

Binomial name
- Stenolis angulata (Fabricius, 1801)

Species of beetle

Stenolis angulata is a species of beetle in the family Cerambycidae. It was described by Johan Christian Fabricius in 1801.
