= Stenolis tavakiliani =

Scientific classification
- Kingdom: Animalia
- Phylum: Arthropoda
- Class: Insecta
- Order: Coleoptera
- Suborder: Polyphaga
- Infraorder: Cucujiformia
- Family: Cerambycidae
- Genus: Stenolis
- Species: S. tavakiliani

Binomial name
- Stenolis tavakiliani Monne, 2011

Species of beetle

Stenolis tavakiliani is a species of beetle in the family Cerambycidae. It was described by Monne in 2011.
