= Stenolis pulverea =

Scientific classification
- Kingdom: Animalia
- Phylum: Arthropoda
- Class: Insecta
- Order: Coleoptera
- Suborder: Polyphaga
- Infraorder: Cucujiformia
- Family: Cerambycidae
- Genus: Stenolis
- Species: S. pulverea

Binomial name
- Stenolis pulverea (Bates, 1881)

Species of beetle

Stenolis pulverea is a species of beetle in the family Cerambycidae. It was described by Henry Walter Bates in 1881.
