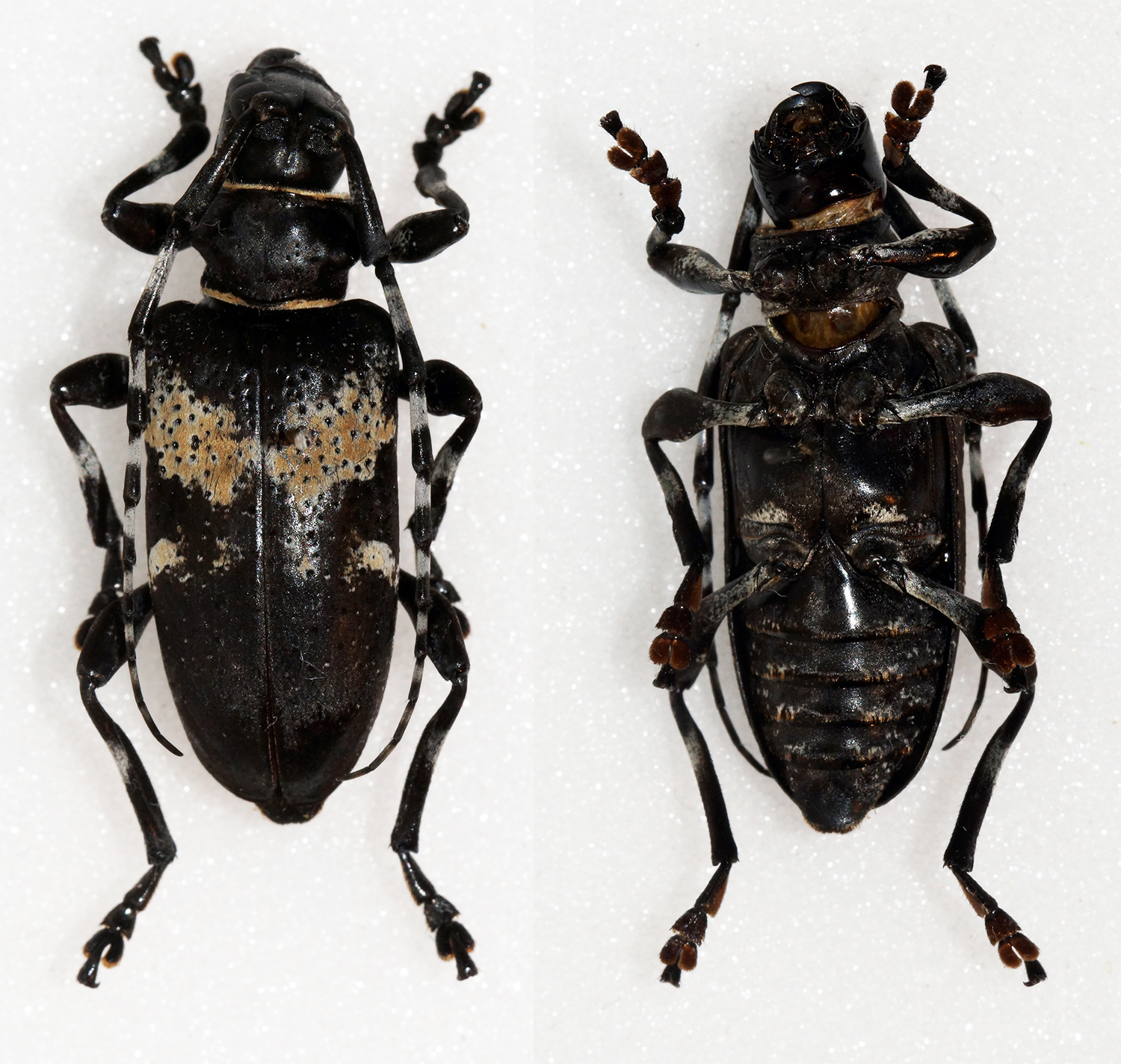

Scientific classification
- Kingdom: Animalia
- Phylum: Arthropoda
- Class: Insecta
- Order: Coleoptera
- Suborder: Polyphaga
- Infraorder: Cucujiformia
- Family: Cerambycidae
- Genus: Coenopoeus
- Species: C. palmeri

Binomial name
- Coenopoeus palmeri (LeConte, 1873)

= Coenopoeus palmeri =

Species of beetle

Coenopoeus palmeri is a species of longhorn beetle of the subfamily Lamiinae. It was described by John Lawrence LeConte in 1873.
