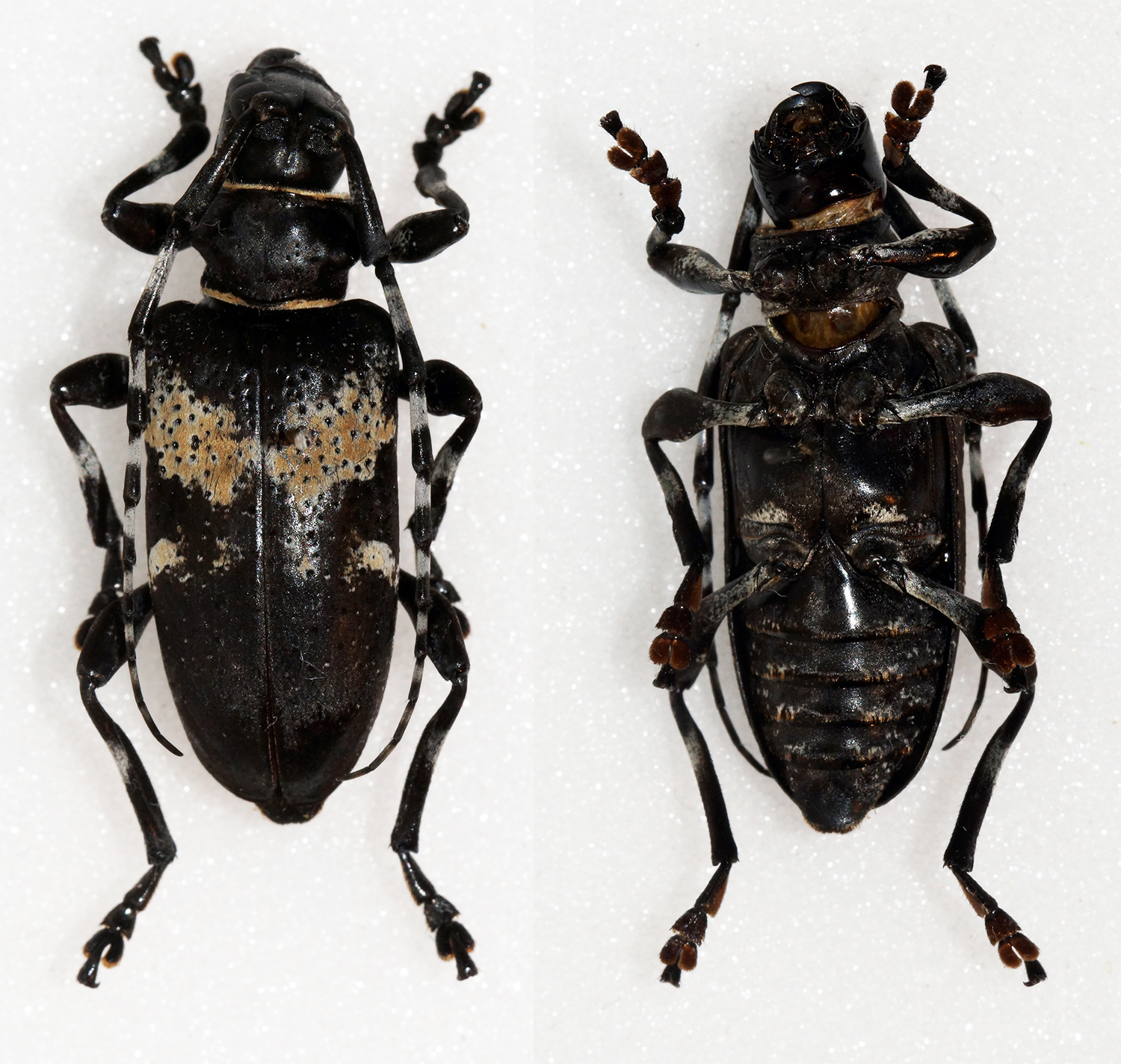
- Coenopoeus palmeri

Scientific classification
- Kingdom: Animalia
- Phylum: Arthropoda
- Class: Insecta
- Order: Coleoptera
- Suborder: Polyphaga
- Infraorder: Cucujiformia
- Family: Cerambycidae
- Tribe: Acanthocinini
- Genus: Coenopoeus

= Coenopoeus =

Genus of beetles

Coenopoeus is a genus of beetles in the family Cerambycidae, containing the following species:

- Coenopoeus niger Horn, 1894
- Coenopoeus palmeri (LeConte, 1873)
