= Coenopoeus niger =

Scientific classification
- Kingdom: Animalia
- Phylum: Arthropoda
- Class: Insecta
- Order: Coleoptera
- Suborder: Polyphaga
- Infraorder: Cucujiformia
- Family: Cerambycidae
- Genus: Coenopoeus
- Species: C. niger

Binomial name
- Coenopoeus niger Horn, 1894

Species of beetle

Coenopoeus niger is a species of longhorn beetles of the subfamily Lamiinae. It was described by George Henry Horn in 1894, and is known from Baja California.
