= Trichonyssodrys =

Scientific classification
- Kingdom: Animalia
- Phylum: Arthropoda
- Clade: Pancrustacea
- Class: Insecta
- Order: Coleoptera
- Suborder: Polyphaga
- Infraorder: Cucujiformia
- Family: Cerambycidae
- Tribe: Acanthocinini
- Genus: Trichonyssodrys

Genus of beetles

Trichonyssodrys is a genus of beetles in the family Cerambycidae, containing the following species:

- Trichonyssodrys aureopilosus Monné, 1990
- Trichonyssodrys cinctus Delfino, 1981
- Trichonyssodrys melasmus Delfino, 1981

== Selected former species ==
- Trichonyssodrys maculatus Gilmour, 1957
