= Pentheochaetes argentinus =

Scientific classification
- Kingdom: Animalia
- Phylum: Arthropoda
- Class: Insecta
- Order: Coleoptera
- Suborder: Polyphaga
- Infraorder: Cucujiformia
- Family: Cerambycidae
- Genus: Pentheochaetes
- Species: P. argentinus

Binomial name
- Pentheochaetes argentinus Mendes, 1937

Species of beetle

Pentheochaetes argentinus is a species of beetle in the family Cerambycidae. It was described by Mendes in 1937.
