= Trichonyssodrys cinctus =

Scientific classification
- Kingdom: Animalia
- Phylum: Arthropoda
- Class: Insecta
- Order: Coleoptera
- Suborder: Polyphaga
- Infraorder: Cucujiformia
- Family: Cerambycidae
- Genus: Trichonyssodrys
- Species: T. cinctus

Binomial name
- Trichonyssodrys cinctus Delfino, 1981

Species of beetle

Trichonyssodrys cinctus is a species of beetle in the family Cerambycidae. It was described by Delfino in 1981.
