= Pentheochaetes =

Scientific classification
- Kingdom: Animalia
- Phylum: Arthropoda
- Clade: Pancrustacea
- Class: Insecta
- Order: Coleoptera
- Suborder: Polyphaga
- Infraorder: Cucujiformia
- Family: Cerambycidae
- Tribe: Acanthocinini
- Genus: Pentheochaetes

Genus of beetles

Pentheochaetes is a genus of beetles in the family Cerambycidae, containing the following species:

- Pentheochaetes apicalis Melzer, 1934
- Pentheochaetes argentinus Mendes, 1937
- Pentheochaetes maculata (Gilmour, 1957)
- Pentheochaetes mysticus Melzer, 1932
- Pentheochaetes trinidadensis Gilmour, 1963
- Pentheochaetes turbidus Melzer, 1934
