= Pentheochaetes turbidus =

Scientific classification
- Kingdom: Animalia
- Phylum: Arthropoda
- Class: Insecta
- Order: Coleoptera
- Suborder: Polyphaga
- Infraorder: Cucujiformia
- Family: Cerambycidae
- Genus: Pentheochaetes
- Species: P. turbidus

Binomial name
- Pentheochaetes turbidus Melzer, 1934

Species of beetle

Pentheochaetes turbidus is a species of beetle in the family Cerambycidae. It was described by Melzer in 1934.
