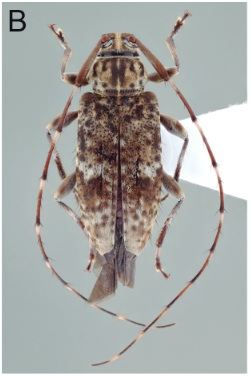

Scientific classification
- Kingdom: Animalia
- Phylum: Arthropoda
- Clade: Pancrustacea
- Class: Insecta
- Order: Coleoptera
- Suborder: Polyphaga
- Infraorder: Cucujiformia
- Family: Cerambycidae
- Genus: Pentheochaetes
- Species: P. mystica

Binomial name
- Pentheochaetes mystica Melzer, 1932

Synonyms
- Pentheochaetes mysticus; Pentheochaetes mysticus var. mediomaculatus Gilmour, 1957

= Pentheochaetes mystica =

Species of beetle

Pentheochaetes mystica is a species of beetle in the family Cerambycidae. It was described by Melzer in 1932. It is found in Brazil (Espirito Santo, Rio de Janeiro, São Paulo, Paraná, Santa Catarina, Rio Grande do Sul), Argentina and Paraguay.
