= Pentheochaetes trinidadensis =

Scientific classification
- Kingdom: Animalia
- Phylum: Arthropoda
- Class: Insecta
- Order: Coleoptera
- Suborder: Polyphaga
- Infraorder: Cucujiformia
- Family: Cerambycidae
- Genus: Pentheochaetes
- Species: P. trinidadensis

Binomial name
- Pentheochaetes trinidadensis Gilmour, 1963

Species of beetle

Pentheochaetes trinidadensis is a species of beetle in the family Cerambycidae. It was described by Gilmour in 1963.
