= Pentheochaetes maculata =

Scientific classification
- Kingdom: Animalia
- Phylum: Arthropoda
- Clade: Pancrustacea
- Class: Insecta
- Order: Coleoptera
- Suborder: Polyphaga
- Infraorder: Cucujiformia
- Family: Cerambycidae
- Genus: Pentheochaetes
- Species: P. maculata

Binomial name
- Pentheochaetes maculata (Gilmour, 1957)

Synonyms
- Trichonyssodrys maculata Gilmour, 1957; Trichonyssodrys maculatus

Species of insect

Pentheochaetes maculata is a species of beetle in the family Cerambycidae. It was described by Gilmour in 1957. It is found in Brazil (Minas Gerais, Espírito Santo, São Paulo, Santa Catarina) and Argentina (Misiones).
