= Xylergates capixaba =

Scientific classification
- Kingdom: Animalia
- Phylum: Arthropoda
- Class: Insecta
- Order: Coleoptera
- Suborder: Polyphaga
- Infraorder: Cucujiformia
- Family: Cerambycidae
- Genus: Xylergates
- Species: X. capixaba

Binomial name
- Xylergates capixaba Giorgi & Corbett, 2005

Species of beetle

Xylergates capixaba is a species of beetle in the family Cerambycidae. It was described by Giorgi and Corbett in 2005.
