= Xylergates picturatus =

Scientific classification
- Kingdom: Animalia
- Phylum: Arthropoda
- Class: Insecta
- Order: Coleoptera
- Suborder: Polyphaga
- Infraorder: Cucujiformia
- Family: Cerambycidae
- Genus: Xylergates
- Species: X. picturatus

Binomial name
- Xylergates picturatus Lane, 1957

Species of beetle

Xylergates picturatus is a species of beetle in the family Cerambycidae. It was described by Lane in 1957.
