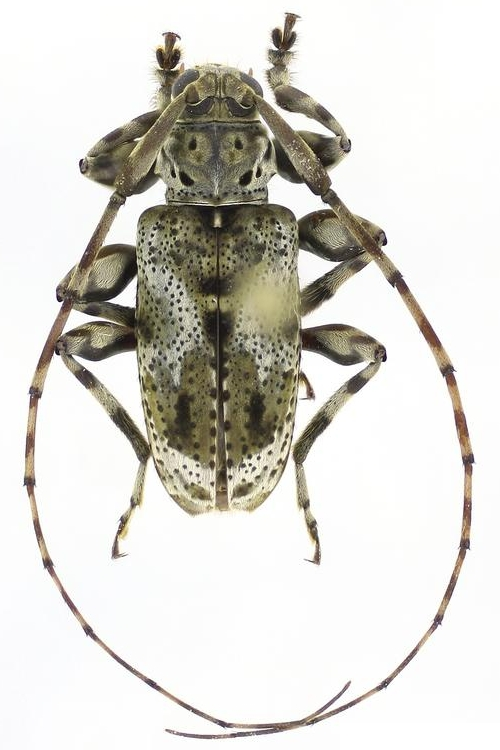
- Xylergates elaineae

Scientific classification
- Kingdom: Animalia
- Phylum: Arthropoda
- Class: Insecta
- Order: Coleoptera
- Suborder: Polyphaga
- Infraorder: Cucujiformia
- Family: Cerambycidae
- Tribe: Acanthocinini
- Genus: Xylergates

= Xylergates =

Genus of beetles

Xylergates is a genus of beetles in the family Cerambycidae, containing the following species:

- Xylergates capixaba Giorgi & Corbett, 2005
- Xylergates elaineae Gilmour, 1962
- Xylergates lacteus Bates, 1864
- Xylergates picturatus Lane, 1957
- Xylergates pulcher Lane, 1957
