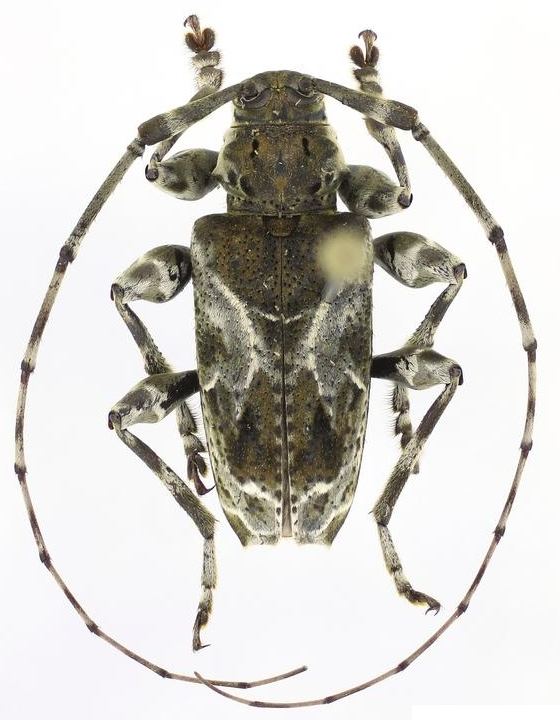
- Xylergates lacteus

Scientific classification
- Kingdom: Animalia
- Phylum: Arthropoda
- Class: Insecta
- Order: Coleoptera
- Suborder: Polyphaga
- Infraorder: Cucujiformia
- Family: Cerambycidae
- Genus: Xylergates
- Species: X. lacteus

Binomial name
- Xylergates lacteus Bates, 1864

= Xylergates lacteus =

Species of beetle

Xylergates lacteus is a species of beetle in the family Cerambycidae. It was described by Bates in 1864.
