= Xylergates pulcher =

Scientific classification
- Kingdom: Animalia
- Phylum: Arthropoda
- Class: Insecta
- Order: Coleoptera
- Suborder: Polyphaga
- Infraorder: Cucujiformia
- Family: Cerambycidae
- Genus: Xylergates
- Species: X. pulcher

Binomial name
- Xylergates pulcher Lane, 1957

Species of beetle

Xylergates pulcher is a species of beetle in the family Cerambycidae. It was described by Lane in 1957.
