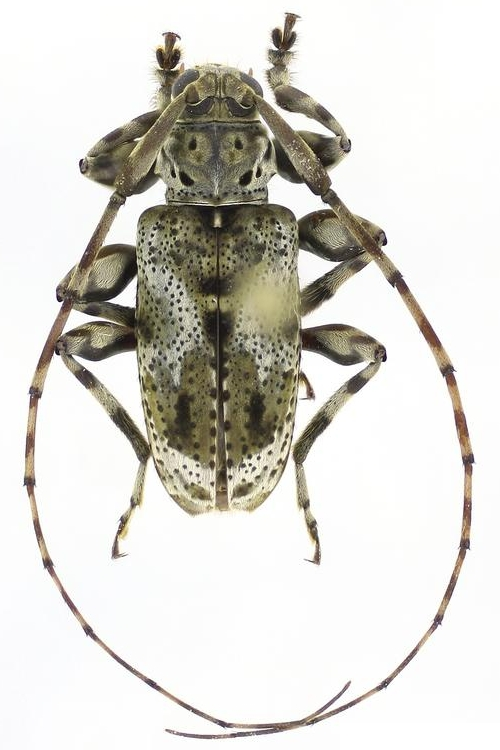

Scientific classification
- Kingdom: Animalia
- Phylum: Arthropoda
- Class: Insecta
- Order: Coleoptera
- Suborder: Polyphaga
- Infraorder: Cucujiformia
- Family: Cerambycidae
- Genus: Xylergates
- Species: X. elaineae

Binomial name
- Xylergates elaineae Gilmour, 1962

= Xylergates elaineae =

Species of beetle

Xylergates elaineae is a species of beetle in the family Cerambycidae. It was described by Gilmour in 1962.
