= Trypanidius insularis =

Scientific classification
- Kingdom: Animalia
- Phylum: Arthropoda
- Class: Insecta
- Order: Coleoptera
- Suborder: Polyphaga
- Infraorder: Cucujiformia
- Family: Cerambycidae
- Genus: Trypanidius
- Species: T. insularis

Binomial name
- Trypanidius insularis Fisher, 1925

Synonyms
- Trypanidius nocturnus Fisher, 1942

Species of beetles

Trypanidius insularis is a species of longhorn beetles of the subfamily Lamiinae. It was described by Fisher in 1925.
