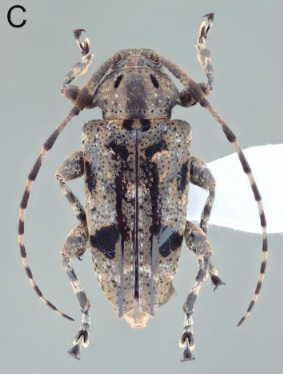

Scientific classification
- Kingdom: Animalia
- Phylum: Arthropoda
- Clade: Pancrustacea
- Class: Insecta
- Order: Coleoptera
- Suborder: Polyphaga
- Infraorder: Cucujiformia
- Family: Cerambycidae
- Genus: Trypanidius
- Species: T. maculatus

Binomial name
- Trypanidius maculatus Monné & Delfino, 1980

= Trypanidius maculatus =

Species of beetle

Trypanidius maculatus is a species of beetle of the family Cerambycidae. It is found in Venezuela, Brazil (Pará, Mato Grosso, São Paulo), Argentina and Paraguay.
