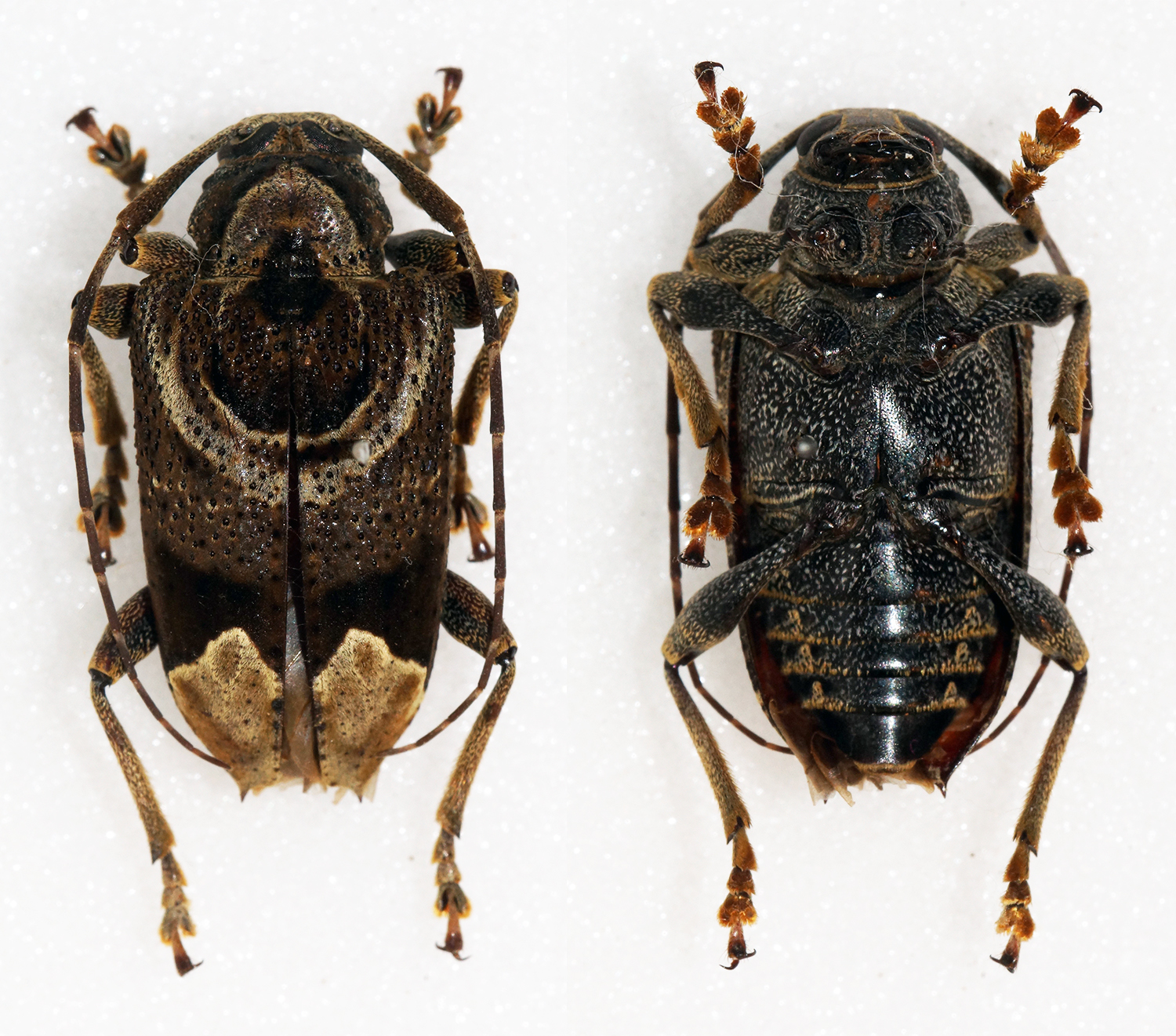
- Trypanidius andicola

Scientific classification
- Kingdom: Animalia
- Phylum: Arthropoda
- Class: Insecta
- Order: Coleoptera
- Suborder: Polyphaga
- Infraorder: Cucujiformia
- Family: Cerambycidae
- Tribe: Acanthocinini
- Genus: Trypanidius; Blanchard, 1847

= Trypanidius =

Genus of beetles

Trypanidius is a genus of longhorn beetles of the subfamily Lamiinae, containing 15 described species.

== Species ==
- Trypanidius albosignatus (Melzer, 1932)
- Trypanidius andicola Blanchard, 1847
- Trypanidius apicalis Aurivillius, 1921
- Trypanidius dimidiatus Thomson, 1860
- Trypanidius insularis Fisher, 1925
- Trypanidius irroratus Monné & Delfino, 1980
- Trypanidius isolatus Waterhouse, 1890
- Trypanidius kitayamai Bezark, 2019
- Trypanidius maculatus Monné & Delfino, 1980
- Trypanidius mexicanus Thomson, 1860
- Trypanidius mimicavus Carelli, Monné & Souza, 2013
- Trypanidius notatus (Fabricius, 1787)
- Trypanidius proximus Melzer, 1931
- Trypanidius rubripes Bates, 1872
- Trypanidius spilmani Villiers, 1980
