= Onalcidion =

Scientific classification
- Kingdom: Animalia
- Phylum: Arthropoda
- Class: Insecta
- Order: Coleoptera
- Suborder: Polyphaga
- Infraorder: Cucujiformia
- Family: Cerambycidae
- Tribe: Acanthocinini
- Genus: Onalcidion; Thomson, 1864

Genus of beetles

Onalcidion is a genus of beetles in the family Cerambycidae, containing the following species:

- Onalcidion antonkozlovi Monné, Nascimento, Monné & Santos-Silva, 2019
- Onalcidion fibrosum Monné & Martins, 1976
- Onalcidion lingafelteri Audureau, 2018
- Onalcidion maculatum Vlasak & Santos-Silva, 2021
- Onalcidion obscurum Gilmour, 1957
- Onalcidion pictulum (White, 1855)
- Onalcidion tavakiliani Audureau, 2013
