= Onalcidion obscurum =

Scientific classification
- Kingdom: Animalia
- Phylum: Arthropoda
- Class: Insecta
- Order: Coleoptera
- Suborder: Polyphaga
- Infraorder: Cucujiformia
- Family: Cerambycidae
- Genus: Onalcidion
- Species: O. obscurum

Binomial name
- Onalcidion obscurum Gilmour, 1957

Species of beetle

Onalcidion obscurum is a species of beetle in the family Cerambycidae. It was described by Gilmour in 1957.
