= Onalcidion fibrosum =

Scientific classification
- Kingdom: Animalia
- Phylum: Arthropoda
- Class: Insecta
- Order: Coleoptera
- Suborder: Polyphaga
- Infraorder: Cucujiformia
- Family: Cerambycidae
- Genus: Onalcidion
- Species: O. fibrosum

Binomial name
- Onalcidion fibrosum Monné & Martins, 1976

Species of beetle

Onalcidion fibrosum is a species of beetle in the family Cerambycidae. It was described by Monné and Martins in 1976.
