= Liopinus =

Scientific classification
- Domain: Eukaryota
- Kingdom: Animalia
- Phylum: Arthropoda
- Class: Insecta
- Order: Coleoptera
- Suborder: Polyphaga
- Infraorder: Cucujiformia
- Family: Cerambycidae
- Tribe: Acanthocinini
- Genus: Liopinus; Linsley & Chemsak, 1995

Genus of beetles

Liopinus is a genus of longhorn beetles of the subfamily Lamiinae. It was described by Linsley and Chemsak in 1995.

== Species ==
- Liopinus alpha (Say, 1827)
- Liopinus centralis (LeConte, 1884)
- Liopinus chemsaki (Lewis, 1977)
- Liopinus decorus (Fall, 1907)
- Liopinus imitans (Knull, 1936)
- Liopinus incognitus (Lewis, 1977)
- Liopinus mimeticus (Casey, 1891)
- Liopinus misellus (LeConte, 1852)
- Liopinus punctatus (Haldeman, 1847)
- Liopinus wiltii (Horn, 1880)
