= Liopinus mimeticus =

Scientific classification
- Kingdom: Animalia
- Phylum: Arthropoda
- Class: Insecta
- Order: Coleoptera
- Suborder: Polyphaga
- Infraorder: Cucujiformia
- Family: Cerambycidae
- Genus: Liopinus
- Species: L. mimeticus

Binomial name
- Liopinus mimeticus (Casey, 1891)

Species of beetle

Liopinus mimeticus is a species of beetle in the family Cerambycidae. It was described by Casey in 1891.
