= Liopinus misellus =

Scientific classification
- Domain: Eukaryota
- Kingdom: Animalia
- Phylum: Arthropoda
- Class: Insecta
- Order: Coleoptera
- Suborder: Polyphaga
- Infraorder: Cucujiformia
- Family: Cerambycidae
- Genus: Liopinus
- Species: L. misellus

Binomial name
- Liopinus misellus (LeConte, 1852)

Species of beetle

Liopinus misellus is a species of beetle in the family Cerambycidae. It was described by John Lawrence LeConte in 1852.
