= Liopinus decorus =

Scientific classification
- Domain: Eukaryota
- Kingdom: Animalia
- Phylum: Arthropoda
- Class: Insecta
- Order: Coleoptera
- Suborder: Polyphaga
- Infraorder: Cucujiformia
- Family: Cerambycidae
- Genus: Liopinus
- Species: L. decorus

Binomial name
- Liopinus decorus (Fall, 1907)

Species of beetle

Liopinus decorus is a species of beetle in the family Cerambycidae. It was described by Fall in 1907.
