= Liopinus wiltii =

Scientific classification
- Domain: Eukaryota
- Kingdom: Animalia
- Phylum: Arthropoda
- Class: Insecta
- Order: Coleoptera
- Suborder: Polyphaga
- Infraorder: Cucujiformia
- Family: Cerambycidae
- Genus: Liopinus
- Species: L. wiltii

Binomial name
- Liopinus wiltii (Horn, 1880)

Species of beetle

Liopinus wiltii is a species of beetle in the family Cerambycidae. It was described by Horn in 1880.
