= Liopinus centralis =

Scientific classification
- Kingdom: Animalia
- Phylum: Arthropoda
- Class: Insecta
- Order: Coleoptera
- Suborder: Polyphaga
- Infraorder: Cucujiformia
- Family: Cerambycidae
- Genus: Liopinus
- Species: L. centralis

Binomial name
- Liopinus centralis (LeConte, 1884)

Species of beetle

Liopinus centralis is a species of beetle in the family Cerambycidae. It was described by John Lawrence LeConte in 1884.
