= Liopinus alpha =

Scientific classification
- Domain: Eukaryota
- Kingdom: Animalia
- Phylum: Arthropoda
- Class: Insecta
- Order: Coleoptera
- Suborder: Polyphaga
- Infraorder: Cucujiformia
- Family: Cerambycidae
- Genus: Liopinus
- Species: L. alpha

Binomial name
- Liopinus alpha (Say, 1827)

Species of beetle

Liopinus alpha is a species of beetle in the family Cerambycidae. It was described by Say in 1827.
