= Eugamandus =

Scientific classification
- Kingdom: Animalia
- Phylum: Arthropoda
- Class: Insecta
- Order: Coleoptera
- Suborder: Polyphaga
- Infraorder: Cucujiformia
- Family: Cerambycidae
- Subfamily: Lamiinae
- Tribe: Acanthocinini
- Genus: Eugamandus; Fisher, 1926

Genus of beetles

Eugamandus is a genus of longhorn beetles of the subfamily Lamiinae. It was described by Warren Samuel Fisher in 1926.

== Species ==
- Eugamandus brunneus Fisher, 1935 (Synonym of Eugamandus oakleyi?)
- Eugamandus cayamae Fisher, 1926
- Eugamandus darlingtoni Fisher, 1942
- Eugamandus flavipes Fisher, 1935
- Eugamandus jamaicensis Vitali, 2003
- Eugamandus oakleyi Fisher, 1935
- Eugamandus ricarti Micheli, 2003
- Eugamandus schwarzi Fisher, 1926
- Eugamandus tuberculatus Fisher, 1942
