= Eugamandus darlingtoni =

Scientific classification
- Kingdom: Animalia
- Phylum: Arthropoda
- Class: Insecta
- Order: Coleoptera
- Suborder: Polyphaga
- Infraorder: Cucujiformia
- Family: Cerambycidae
- Genus: Eugamandus
- Species: E. darlingtoni

Binomial name
- Eugamandus darlingtoni Fisher, 1942

Species of beetle

Eugamandus darlingtoni is a species of longhorn beetles of the subfamily Lamiinae. It was described by Fisher in 1942, and is known from Dominicana.
