= Eugamandus brunneus =

Scientific classification
- Kingdom: Animalia
- Phylum: Arthropoda
- Class: Insecta
- Order: Coleoptera
- Suborder: Polyphaga
- Infraorder: Cucujiformia
- Family: Cerambycidae
- Genus: Eugamandus
- Species: E. brunneus

Binomial name
- Eugamandus brunneus Fisher, 1935

Species of beetle

Eugamandus brunneus is a species of longhorn beetles of the subfamily Lamiinae. It was described by Fisher in 1935.
