= Eugamandus ricarti =

Scientific classification
- Kingdom: Animalia
- Phylum: Arthropoda
- Class: Insecta
- Order: Coleoptera
- Suborder: Polyphaga
- Infraorder: Cucujiformia
- Family: Cerambycidae
- Genus: Eugamandus
- Species: E. ricarti

Binomial name
- Eugamandus ricarti Micheli, 2003

Species of beetle

Eugamandus ricarti is a species of longhorn beetle of the subfamily Lamiinae. It was described by Micheli in 2003, and is known from Puerto Rico.
