= Eugamandus schwarzi =

Scientific classification
- Kingdom: Animalia
- Phylum: Arthropoda
- Clade: Pancrustacea
- Class: Insecta
- Order: Coleoptera
- Suborder: Polyphaga
- Infraorder: Cucujiformia
- Family: Cerambycidae
- Genus: Eugamandus
- Species: E. schwarzi

Binomial name
- Eugamandus schwarzi Fisher, 1926

Species of beetle

Eugamandus schwarzi is a species of longhorn beetles of the subfamily Lamiinae. It was described by Fisher in 1926, and is known from Cuba.
