= Eugamandus jamaicensis =

Scientific classification
- Kingdom: Animalia
- Phylum: Arthropoda
- Class: Insecta
- Order: Coleoptera
- Suborder: Polyphaga
- Infraorder: Cucujiformia
- Family: Cerambycidae
- Genus: Eugamandus
- Species: E. jamaicensis

Binomial name
- Eugamandus jamaicensis Vitali, 2003

Species of beetle

Eugamandus jamaicensis is a species of longhorn beetle of the subfamily Lamiinae. It was described by Vitali in 2003, and is known from Jamaica, from which its species epithet is derived.
