= Lepturgantes =

Scientific classification
- Domain: Eukaryota
- Kingdom: Animalia
- Phylum: Arthropoda
- Class: Insecta
- Order: Coleoptera
- Suborder: Polyphaga
- Infraorder: Cucujiformia
- Family: Cerambycidae
- Tribe: Acanthocinini
- Genus: Lepturgantes

Genus of beetles

Lepturgantes is a genus of beetles in the family Cerambycidae. The genus is placed in subfamily Lamiinae and tribe Acanthocinini.

Ten species are currently recognised:

- Lepturgantes candicans (Bates, 1863)
- Lepturgantes dorsalis (White, 1855)
- Lepturgantes flavovittatus (Gilmour, 1959)
- Lepturgantes pacificus Gilmour, 1960
- Lepturgantes prolatus Monne & Monne, 2008
- Lepturgantes pseudodorsalis J.-P. Roguet, 2023
- Lepturgantes septemlineatus Gilmour, 1960
- Lepturgantes seriatus Monné, 1988
- Lepturgantes simplex J.-P. Roguet, 2023
- Lepturgantes variegatus Gilmour, 1957

The species Lepturgantes dilectus (Bates, 1863) is considered a synonym of Lepturgantes dorsalis.
