= Lepturgantes seriatus =

Scientific classification
- Domain: Eukaryota
- Kingdom: Animalia
- Phylum: Arthropoda
- Class: Insecta
- Order: Coleoptera
- Suborder: Polyphaga
- Infraorder: Cucujiformia
- Family: Cerambycidae
- Genus: Lepturgantes
- Species: L. seriatus

Binomial name
- Lepturgantes seriatus Monné, 1988

Species of beetle

Lepturgantes seriatus is a species of beetle in the family Cerambycidae. It was described by Monné in 1988.
