= Lepturgantes variegatus =

Scientific classification
- Domain: Eukaryota
- Kingdom: Animalia
- Phylum: Arthropoda
- Class: Insecta
- Order: Coleoptera
- Suborder: Polyphaga
- Infraorder: Cucujiformia
- Family: Cerambycidae
- Genus: Lepturgantes
- Species: L. variegatus

Binomial name
- Lepturgantes variegatus Gilmour, 1957

Species of beetle

Lepturgantes variegatus is a species of beetle in the family Cerambycidae. It was described by Gilmour in 1957.
