= Lepturgantes candicans =

Scientific classification
- Domain: Eukaryota
- Kingdom: Animalia
- Phylum: Arthropoda
- Class: Insecta
- Order: Coleoptera
- Suborder: Polyphaga
- Infraorder: Cucujiformia
- Family: Cerambycidae
- Genus: Lepturgantes
- Species: L. candicans

Binomial name
- Lepturgantes candicans (Bates, 1863)

Species of beetle

Lepturgantes candicans is a species of beetle in the family Cerambycidae. It was described by Bates in 1863.
