= Lepturgantes dorsalis =

Scientific classification
- Domain: Eukaryota
- Kingdom: Animalia
- Phylum: Arthropoda
- Class: Insecta
- Order: Coleoptera
- Suborder: Polyphaga
- Infraorder: Cucujiformia
- Family: Cerambycidae
- Genus: Lepturgantes
- Species: L. dorsalis

Binomial name
- Lepturgantes dorsalis (White, 1855)

Synonyms
- Lepturges dilecta Bates, 1863; Lepturgantes dilectus (Bates, 1863)

Species of beetle

Lepturgantes dorsalis is a species of beetle in the family Cerambycidae.

The species Lepturges dilectus described by Bates in 1863 is considered an ambiguous synonym of Lepturgantes dorsalis.
