= Acanthodoxus machacalis =

Scientific classification
- Domain: Eukaryota
- Kingdom: Animalia
- Phylum: Arthropoda
- Class: Insecta
- Order: Coleoptera
- Suborder: Polyphaga
- Infraorder: Cucujiformia
- Family: Cerambycidae
- Genus: Acanthodoxus
- Species: A. machacalis

Binomial name
- Acanthodoxus machacalis Martins & Monné, 1974

Species of beetle

Acanthodoxus machacalis is a species of longhorn beetles of the subfamily Lamiinae. It was described by Martins and Monné in 1974, and is known from Brazil.
