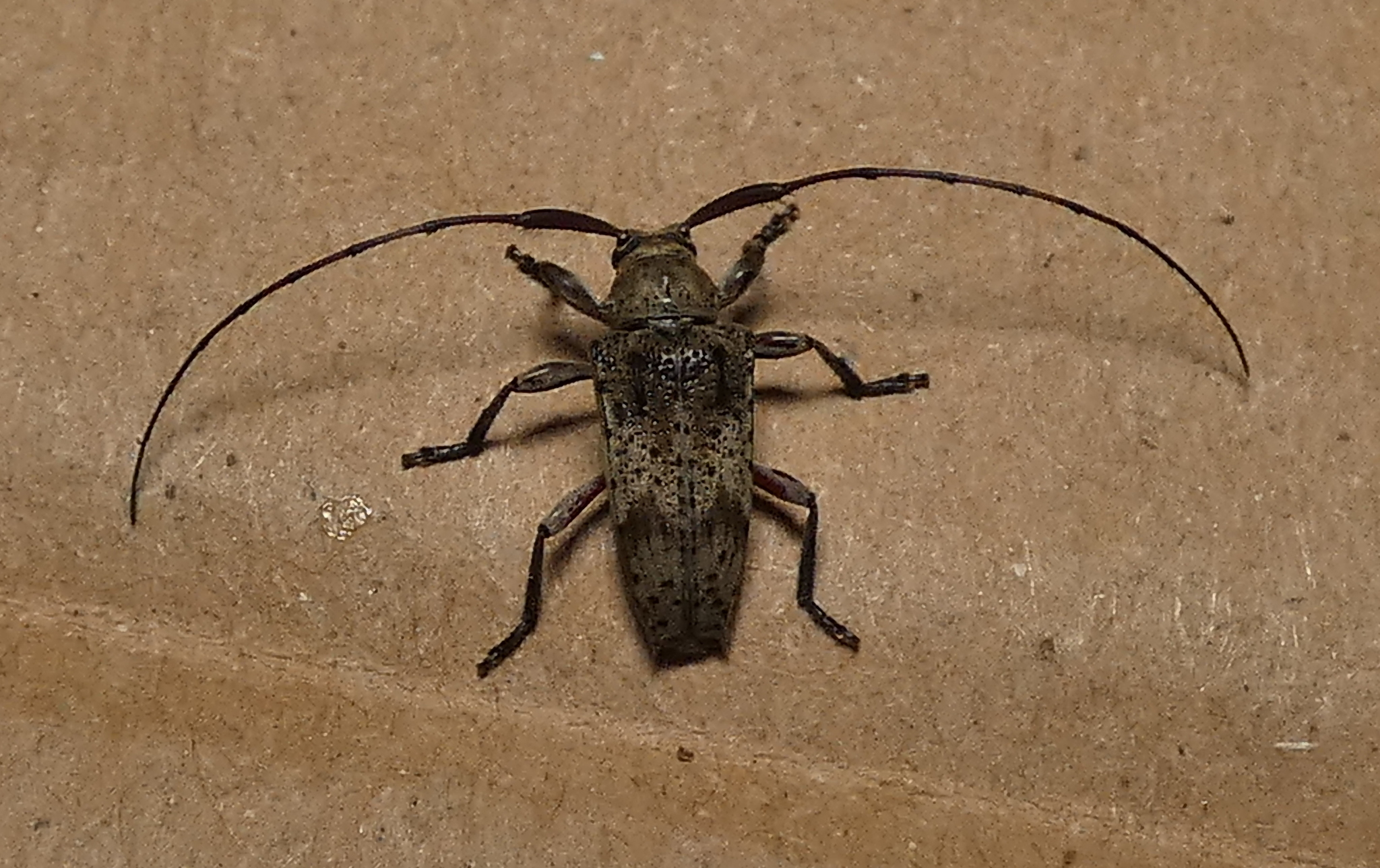

Scientific classification
- Kingdom: Animalia
- Phylum: Arthropoda
- Class: Insecta
- Order: Coleoptera
- Suborder: Polyphaga
- Infraorder: Cucujiformia
- Family: Cerambycidae
- Genus: Acanthodoxus
- Species: A. delta

Binomial name
- Acanthodoxus delta Martins & Monné, 1974

= Acanthodoxus delta =

Species of beetle

Acanthodoxus delta is a species of longhorn beetles of the subfamily Lamiinae from Brazil. It was described by Martins and Monné in 1974.
