= Acanthodoxus =

Scientific classification
- Domain: Eukaryota
- Kingdom: Animalia
- Phylum: Arthropoda
- Class: Insecta
- Order: Coleoptera
- Suborder: Polyphaga
- Infraorder: Cucujiformia
- Family: Cerambycidae
- Tribe: Acanthocinini
- Genus: Acanthodoxus

Genus of beetles

Acanthodoxus is a genus of beetles in the family Cerambycidae, containing the following species:

- Acanthodoxus delta Martins & Monné, 1974
- Acanthodoxus machacalis Martins & Monné, 1974
