= Trichotithonus curvatus =

Scientific classification
- Kingdom: Animalia
- Phylum: Arthropoda
- Clade: Pancrustacea
- Class: Insecta
- Order: Coleoptera
- Suborder: Polyphaga
- Infraorder: Cucujiformia
- Family: Cerambycidae
- Genus: Trichotithonus
- Species: T. curvatus

Binomial name
- Trichotithonus curvatus (Bates, 1885)

Species of beetle

Trichotithonus curvatus is a species of beetle in the family Cerambycidae. It was described by Henry Walter Bates in 1885. This beetle is native to South and Central America and has been recorded from Mexico (Veracruz, Chiapas), Guatemala, Honduras, Nicaragua (Jinotega), Costa Rica (Guanacaste, Puntarenas), Panama, Brazil (Rio de Janeiro, São Paulo, Paraná, Santa Catarina, Rio Grande do Sul) and Bolivia (Santa Cruz).
