= Trichotithonus =

Scientific classification
- Kingdom: Animalia
- Phylum: Arthropoda
- Class: Insecta
- Order: Coleoptera
- Suborder: Polyphaga
- Infraorder: Cucujiformia
- Family: Cerambycidae
- Tribe: Acanthocinini
- Genus: Trichotithonus

Genus of beetles

Trichotithonus is a genus of beetles in the family Cerambycidae, containing the following species:

- Trichotithonus albidus Monné, 1990
- Trichotithonus albosetosus Monné, 1990
- Trichotithonus conspectus Monné, 1990
- Trichotithonus curvatus (Bates, 1885)
- Trichotithonus tavakiliani Monné, 1990
- Trichotithonus tenebrosus Monné, 1990
- Trichotithonus venezuelensis Monné, 1990
- Trichotithonus viridis Monné, 1990
