= Trichonius picticollis =

Scientific classification
- Kingdom: Animalia
- Phylum: Arthropoda
- Class: Insecta
- Order: Coleoptera
- Suborder: Polyphaga
- Infraorder: Cucujiformia
- Family: Cerambycidae
- Genus: Trichonius
- Species: T. picticollis

Binomial name
- Trichonius picticollis Bates, 1864

Species of beetle

Trichonius picticollis is a species of beetle in the family Cerambycidae. It was described by Henry Walter Bates in 1864.
