= Trichonius quadrivittatus =

Scientific classification
- Kingdom: Animalia
- Phylum: Arthropoda
- Class: Insecta
- Order: Coleoptera
- Suborder: Polyphaga
- Infraorder: Cucujiformia
- Family: Cerambycidae
- Genus: Trichonius
- Species: T. quadrivittatus

Binomial name
- Trichonius quadrivittatus Bates, 1864

Species of beetle

Trichonius quadrivittatus is a species of beetle in the family Cerambycidae. It was described by Bates in 1864.
