= Trichonius atlanticus =

Scientific classification
- Kingdom: Animalia
- Phylum: Arthropoda
- Class: Insecta
- Order: Coleoptera
- Suborder: Polyphaga
- Infraorder: Cucujiformia
- Family: Cerambycidae
- Genus: Trichonius
- Species: T. atlanticus

Binomial name
- Trichonius atlanticus Monne & Mermudes, 2008

Species of beetle

Trichonius atlanticus is a species of beetle in the family Cerambycidae. It was described by Monne and Mermudes in 2008.
