= Trichonius =

Scientific classification
- Kingdom: Animalia
- Phylum: Arthropoda
- Class: Insecta
- Order: Coleoptera
- Suborder: Polyphaga
- Infraorder: Cucujiformia
- Family: Cerambycidae
- Tribe: Acanthocinini
- Genus: Trichonius

Genus of beetles

Trichonius is a genus of beetles in the family Cerambycidae, containing the following species:

- Trichonius affinis Monne & Mermudes, 2008
- Trichonius atlanticus Monne & Mermudes, 2008
- Trichonius bellus Monne & Mermudes, 2008
- Trichonius fasciatus Bates, 1864
- Trichonius griseus Monne & Mermudes, 2008
- Trichonius minimus Monne & Mermudes, 2008
- Trichonius picticollis Bates, 1864
- Trichonius quadrivittatus Bates, 1864
