= Myrmecoclytus =

Scientific classification
- Kingdom: Animalia
- Phylum: Arthropoda
- Class: Insecta
- Order: Coleoptera
- Suborder: Polyphaga
- Infraorder: Cucujiformia
- Family: Cerambycidae
- Tribe: Acanthocinini
- Genus: Myrmecoclytus

Genus of beetles

Myrmecoclytus is a genus of beetles in the family Cerambycidae, containing the following species:

- Myrmecoclytus affinis Breuning, 1975
- Myrmecoclytus mayottei Breuning, 1957
- Myrmecoclytus natalensis Hunt & Breuning, 1957
- Myrmecoclytus pauliani Breuning, 1957
- Myrmecoclytus raffrayi Fairmaire, 1895
- Myrmecoclytus singularis Breuning, 1957
- Myrmecoclytus vadoni Breuning, 1957
