= Myrmecoclytus natalensis =

Scientific classification
- Kingdom: Animalia
- Phylum: Arthropoda
- Class: Insecta
- Order: Coleoptera
- Suborder: Polyphaga
- Infraorder: Cucujiformia
- Family: Cerambycidae
- Genus: Myrmecoclytus
- Species: M. natalensis

Binomial name
- Myrmecoclytus natalensis Hunt &Breuning, 1957

Species of beetle

Myrmecoclytus natalensis is a species of beetle in the family Cerambycidae. It was described by Hunt and Breuning in 1957.
