= Myrmecoclytus raffrayi =

Scientific classification
- Kingdom: Animalia
- Phylum: Arthropoda
- Class: Insecta
- Order: Coleoptera
- Suborder: Polyphaga
- Infraorder: Cucujiformia
- Family: Cerambycidae
- Genus: Myrmecoclytus
- Species: M. raffrayi

Binomial name
- Myrmecoclytus raffrayi Fairmaire, 1895

Species of beetle

Myrmecoclytus raffrayi is a species of beetle in the family Cerambycidae. It was described by Fairmaire in 1895.
