= Myrmecoclytus affinis =

Scientific classification
- Kingdom: Animalia
- Phylum: Arthropoda
- Class: Insecta
- Order: Coleoptera
- Suborder: Polyphaga
- Infraorder: Cucujiformia
- Family: Cerambycidae
- Genus: Myrmecoclytus
- Species: M. affinis

Binomial name
- Myrmecoclytus affinis Breuning, 1975

Species of beetle

Myrmecoclytus affinis is a species of beetle in the family Cerambycidae. It was described by Breuning in 1975.
