= Periestola =

Scientific classification
- Kingdom: Animalia
- Phylum: Arthropoda
- Clade: Pancrustacea
- Class: Insecta
- Order: Coleoptera
- Suborder: Polyphaga
- Infraorder: Cucujiformia
- Family: Cerambycidae
- Tribe: Acanthocinini
- Genus: Periestola; Breuning, 1943

Synonyms
- Paracobelura Monné & Martins, 1976

Genus of beetles

Periestola is a genus of beetles in the family Cerambycidae. It was described by Stephan von Breuning in 1943.

== Species ==
Periestola contains the following species:

- Periestola armata (Monné & Delfino, 1986)
- Periestola howdenorum (Corbett, 2004)
- Periestola mazai Santos-Silva, Nascimento, Botero & McClarin, 2021
- Periestola monnei Ávila-Jimenez & Botero, 2026
- Periestola raphaeli (Monné & Monné, 2017)
- Periestola strandi Breuning, 1943
- Periestola wappesi (Corbett, 2004)
