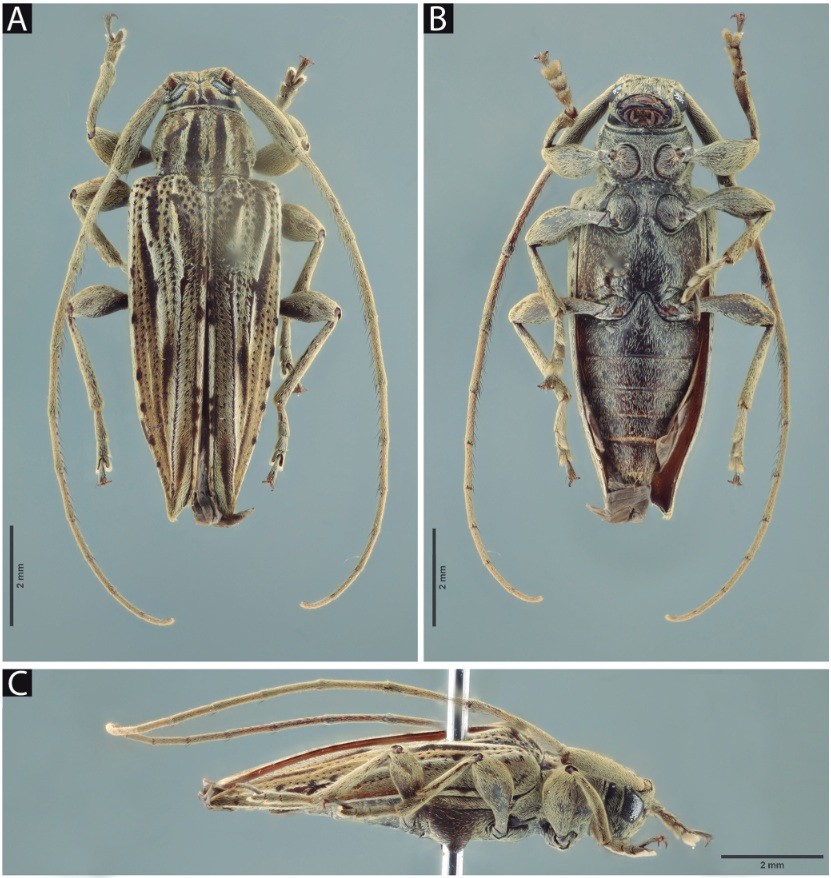

Scientific classification
- Kingdom: Animalia
- Phylum: Arthropoda
- Clade: Pancrustacea
- Class: Insecta
- Order: Coleoptera
- Suborder: Polyphaga
- Infraorder: Cucujiformia
- Family: Cerambycidae
- Genus: Periestola
- Species: P. monnei

Binomial name
- Periestola monnei Ávila-Jimenez & Botero, 2026

= Periestola monnei =

Species of beetle

Periestola monnei is a species of beetle of the family Cerambycidae. It is found in Colombia.

== Description ==
Adults reach a length of about 9.5 mm (0.37 in). The integument is mostly dark brown. The maxillary palpomeres are dark brown with the apex yellowish brown and the gula is mostly reddish brown. Abdominal ventrites 1‑4 dark brown laterally, with ventrite 1 reddish brown centrally, and ventrites 2‑4 orangish brown centrally. Ventrite 5 is orangish brown basally and apically, and dark brown centrally.

== Etymology ==
The species is named in honour of Miguel A. Monné.
