= Probatiomimus eximius =

Scientific classification
- Kingdom: Animalia
- Phylum: Arthropoda
- Clade: Pancrustacea
- Class: Insecta
- Order: Coleoptera
- Suborder: Polyphaga
- Infraorder: Cucujiformia
- Family: Cerambycidae
- Genus: Probatiomimus
- Species: P. eximius

Binomial name
- Probatiomimus eximius Melzer, 1934

Species of beetle

Probatiomimus eximius is a species of beetle in the family Cerambycidae. It was described by Melzer in 1934. It is found in Brazil (Minas Gerais, Paraná) and Paraguay (Itapúa).
