= Probatiomimus zellibori =

Scientific classification
- Kingdom: Animalia
- Phylum: Arthropoda
- Clade: Pancrustacea
- Class: Insecta
- Order: Coleoptera
- Suborder: Polyphaga
- Infraorder: Cucujiformia
- Family: Cerambycidae
- Genus: Probatiomimus
- Species: P. zellibori

Binomial name
- Probatiomimus zellibori Monné, 1990

Species of beetle

Probatiomimus zellibori is a species of beetle in the family Cerambycidae. It was described by Monné in 1990. It is found in Brazil (São Paulo, Paraná, Santa Catarina) and Argentina (Misiones).
