= Probatiomimus schwarzeri =

Scientific classification
- Kingdom: Animalia
- Phylum: Arthropoda
- Class: Insecta
- Order: Coleoptera
- Suborder: Polyphaga
- Infraorder: Cucujiformia
- Family: Cerambycidae
- Genus: Probatiomimus
- Species: P. schwarzeri

Binomial name
- Probatiomimus schwarzeri Melzer, 1926

Species of beetle

Probatiomimus schwarzeri is a species of beetle in the family Cerambycidae. It was described by Melzer in 1926.
