= Probatiomimus =

Scientific classification
- Kingdom: Animalia
- Phylum: Arthropoda
- Class: Insecta
- Order: Coleoptera
- Suborder: Polyphaga
- Infraorder: Cucujiformia
- Family: Cerambycidae
- Tribe: Acanthocinini
- Genus: Probatiomimus

Genus of beetles

Probatiomimus is a genus of beetles in the family Cerambycidae, containing the following species:

- Probatiomimus eximius Melzer, 1934
- Probatiomimus melzeri Schwarzer, 1931
- Probatiomimus schwarzeri Melzer, 1926
- Probatiomimus signiferus (Thomson, 1865)
- Probatiomimus zellibori Monné, 1990
