= Probatiomimus melzeri =

Scientific classification
- Kingdom: Animalia
- Phylum: Arthropoda
- Class: Insecta
- Order: Coleoptera
- Suborder: Polyphaga
- Infraorder: Cucujiformia
- Family: Cerambycidae
- Genus: Probatiomimus
- Species: P. melzeri

Binomial name
- Probatiomimus melzeri Schwarzer, 1931

Species of beetle

Probatiomimus melzeri is a species of beetle in the family Cerambycidae. It was described by Schwarzer in 1931.
