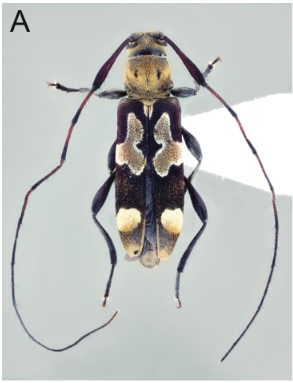

Scientific classification
- Kingdom: Animalia
- Phylum: Arthropoda
- Clade: Pancrustacea
- Class: Insecta
- Order: Coleoptera
- Suborder: Polyphaga
- Infraorder: Cucujiformia
- Family: Cerambycidae
- Genus: Probatiomimus
- Species: P. signiferus

Binomial name
- Probatiomimus signiferus (Thomson, 1865)

Synonyms
- Microplia signifer Thomson, 1865; Probatiomimus zikani Melzer, 1934

= Probatiomimus signiferus =

Species of beetle

Probatiomimus signiferus is a species of beetle in the family Cerambycidae. It was described by Thomson in 1865. It is found in Brazil (Minas Gerais, Espirito Santo, Rio de Janeiro, São Paulo, Paraná), Argentina and Paraguay.
