= Ipochira =

Scientific classification
- Kingdom: Animalia
- Phylum: Arthropoda
- Class: Insecta
- Order: Coleoptera
- Suborder: Polyphaga
- Infraorder: Cucujiformia
- Family: Cerambycidae
- Tribe: Acanthocinini
- Genus: Ipochira

Genus of beetles

Ipochira is a genus of beetles in the family Cerambycidae, containing the following species:

- Ipochira albomaculipennis Breuning, 1966
- Ipochira celebensis Breuning, 1958
- Ipochira enganensis Breuning, 1970
- Ipochira leitensis Breuning, 1970
- Ipochira perlata Pascoe, 1864
- Ipochira philippinarum Aurivillius, 1927
