= Ipochira philippinarum =

Scientific classification
- Kingdom: Animalia
- Phylum: Arthropoda
- Class: Insecta
- Order: Coleoptera
- Suborder: Polyphaga
- Infraorder: Cucujiformia
- Family: Cerambycidae
- Genus: Ipochira
- Species: I. philippinarum

Binomial name
- Ipochira philippinarum Aurivillius, 1927

Species of beetle

Ipochira philippinarum is a species of beetle in the family Cerambycidae. It was described by Per Olof Christopher Aurivillius in 1927.
