= Brevoxathres fasciata =

Scientific classification
- Kingdom: Animalia
- Phylum: Arthropoda
- Class: Insecta
- Order: Coleoptera
- Suborder: Polyphaga
- Infraorder: Cucujiformia
- Family: Cerambycidae
- Genus: Brevoxathres
- Species: B. fasciata

Binomial name
- Brevoxathres fasciata Gilmour, 1959

Species of beetle

Brevoxathres fasciata is a species of longhorn beetles of the subfamily Lamiinae. It was described by Gilmour in 1959, and is known from southern Brazil.
