= Brevoxathres =

Scientific classification
- Kingdom: Animalia
- Phylum: Arthropoda
- Class: Insecta
- Order: Coleoptera
- Suborder: Polyphaga
- Infraorder: Cucujiformia
- Family: Cerambycidae
- Subfamily: Lamiinae
- Tribe: Acanthocinini
- Genus: Brevoxathres; Gilmour, 1959

Genus of beetles

Brevoxathres is a genus of beetles in the family Cerambycidae, containing the following species:

- Brevoxathres albobrunneus (Gilmour, 1962)
- Brevoxathres fasciata Gilmour, 1959
- Brevoxathres irrorata Monne, 2007
- Brevoxathres seabrai Monne, 2007
- Brevoxathres x-littera (Melzer, 1932)
