= Brevoxathres seabrai =

Scientific classification
- Kingdom: Animalia
- Phylum: Arthropoda
- Class: Insecta
- Order: Coleoptera
- Suborder: Polyphaga
- Infraorder: Cucujiformia
- Family: Cerambycidae
- Genus: Brevoxathres
- Species: B. seabrai

Binomial name
- Brevoxathres seabrai Monne, 2007

Species of beetle

Brevoxathres seabrai is a species of longhorn beetles of the subfamily Lamiinae. It was described by Monne in 2007, and is known from Brazil.
