= Brevoxathres x-littera =

Scientific classification
- Kingdom: Animalia
- Phylum: Arthropoda
- Class: Insecta
- Order: Coleoptera
- Suborder: Polyphaga
- Infraorder: Cucujiformia
- Family: Cerambycidae
- Genus: Brevoxathres
- Species: B. x-littera

Binomial name
- Brevoxathres x-littera (Melzer, 1932)

Species of beetle

Brevoxathres x-littera is a species of longhorn beetles of the subfamily Lamiinae. It was described by Melzer in 1932, and is known from eastern Brazil and Bolivia.
