= Brevoxathres albobrunneus =

Scientific classification
- Kingdom: Animalia
- Phylum: Arthropoda
- Class: Insecta
- Order: Coleoptera
- Suborder: Polyphaga
- Infraorder: Cucujiformia
- Family: Cerambycidae
- Genus: Brevoxathres
- Species: B. albobrunneus

Binomial name
- Brevoxathres albobrunneus (Gilmour, 1962)

Species of beetle

Brevoxathres albobrunneus is a species of longhorn beetles of the subfamily Lamiinae. It was described by Gilmour in 1962, and is known from Peru and Bolivia.
