= Chydaeopsis mindanaonis =

Scientific classification
- Kingdom: Animalia
- Phylum: Arthropoda
- Class: Insecta
- Order: Coleoptera
- Suborder: Polyphaga
- Infraorder: Cucujiformia
- Family: Cerambycidae
- Genus: Chydaeopsis
- Species: C. mindanaonis

Binomial name
- Chydaeopsis mindanaonis Breuning, 1982

Species of beetle

Chydaeopsis mindanaonis is a species of beetle in the family Cerambycidae. It was described by Breuning in 1982.
