= Chydaeopsis lumawigi =

Scientific classification
- Kingdom: Animalia
- Phylum: Arthropoda
- Class: Insecta
- Order: Coleoptera
- Suborder: Polyphaga
- Infraorder: Cucujiformia
- Family: Cerambycidae
- Genus: Chydaeopsis
- Species: C. lumawigi

Binomial name
- Chydaeopsis lumawigi Breuning, 1980

Species of beetle

Chydaeopsis lumawigi is a species of beetle in the family Cerambycidae. It was described by Breuning in 1980.
