= Chydaeopsis =

Scientific classification
- Kingdom: Animalia
- Phylum: Arthropoda
- Class: Insecta
- Order: Coleoptera
- Suborder: Polyphaga
- Infraorder: Cucujiformia
- Family: Cerambycidae
- Subfamily: Lamiinae
- Tribe: Acanthocinini
- Genus: Chydaeopsis; Pascoe, 1864

Genus of beetles

Chydaeopsis is a genus of beetles in the family Cerambycidae, containing the following species:

- Chydaeopsis fragilis Pascoe, 1864
- Chydaeopsis lumawigi Breuning, 1980
- Chydaeopsis luzonica Heller, 1923
- Chydaeopsis mindanaonis Breuning, 1982
- Chydaeopsis ruficollis Aurivillius, 1922
