= Chydaeopsis luzonica =

Scientific classification
- Kingdom: Animalia
- Phylum: Arthropoda
- Class: Insecta
- Order: Coleoptera
- Suborder: Polyphaga
- Infraorder: Cucujiformia
- Family: Cerambycidae
- Genus: Chydaeopsis
- Species: C. luzonica

Binomial name
- Chydaeopsis luzonica Heller, 1923

Species of beetle

Chydaeopsis luzonica is a species of beetle in the family Cerambycidae. It was described by Heller in 1923.
