= Boninella =

Scientific classification
- Kingdom: Animalia
- Phylum: Arthropoda
- Class: Insecta
- Order: Coleoptera
- Suborder: Polyphaga
- Infraorder: Cucujiformia
- Family: Cerambycidae
- Subfamily: Lamiinae
- Tribe: Acanthocinini
- Genus: Boninella; Gressitt, 1956

Genus of beetles

Boninella is a genus of beetles in the family Cerambycidae, containing the following species:

- Boninella anolops (N. Ohbayashi, 1976)
- Boninella degenerata Gressitt, 1956
- Boninella hirsuta (N. Ohbayashi, 1976)
- Boninella igai N. Ohbayashi, 1976
- Boninella satoi (N. Ohbayashi, 1976)
