= Boninella satoi =

Scientific classification
- Kingdom: Animalia
- Phylum: Arthropoda
- Class: Insecta
- Order: Coleoptera
- Suborder: Polyphaga
- Infraorder: Cucujiformia
- Family: Cerambycidae
- Genus: Boninella
- Species: B. satoi

Binomial name
- Boninella satoi (N. Ohbayashi, 1976)

Species of beetle

Boninella satoi is a species of beetle in the family Cerambycidae. It was described by N. Ohbayashi in 1976.
