= Boninella degenerata =

Scientific classification
- Kingdom: Animalia
- Phylum: Arthropoda
- Class: Insecta
- Order: Coleoptera
- Suborder: Polyphaga
- Infraorder: Cucujiformia
- Family: Cerambycidae
- Genus: Boninella
- Species: B. degenerata

Binomial name
- Boninella degenerata Gressitt, 1956

Species of beetle

Boninella degenerata is a species of beetle in the family Cerambycidae. It was described by Gressitt in 1956.
