= Boninella igai =

Scientific classification
- Kingdom: Animalia
- Phylum: Arthropoda
- Class: Insecta
- Order: Coleoptera
- Suborder: Polyphaga
- Infraorder: Cucujiformia
- Family: Cerambycidae
- Genus: Boninella
- Species: B. igai

Binomial name
- Boninella igai N. Ohbayashi, 1976

Species of beetle

Boninella igai is a species of beetle in the family Cerambycidae. It was described by N. Ohbayashi in 1976.
