= Hamatastus excelsus =

Scientific classification
- Kingdom: Animalia
- Phylum: Arthropoda
- Class: Insecta
- Order: Coleoptera
- Suborder: Polyphaga
- Infraorder: Cucujiformia
- Family: Cerambycidae
- Genus: Hamatastus
- Species: H. excelsus

Binomial name
- Hamatastus excelsus Monné, 1978

Species of beetle

Hamatastus excelsus is a species of longhorn beetle in the family Cerambycidae. It was described by Miguel A. Monné in 1978.
