= Hamatastus =

Scientific classification
- Kingdom: Animalia
- Phylum: Arthropoda
- Class: Insecta
- Order: Coleoptera
- Suborder: Polyphaga
- Infraorder: Cucujiformia
- Family: Cerambycidae
- Tribe: Acanthocinini
- Genus: Hamatastus

Genus of beetles

Hamatastus is a genus of beetles in the family Cerambycidae, containing the following species:

- Hamatastus conspectus Monné, 1985
- Hamatastus excelsus Monné, 1978
- Hamatastus fasciatus Gilmour, 1957
- Hamatastus lemniscatus Monné, 1985
- Hamatastus simillimus Monné, 1990
