= Hamatastus fasciatus =

Scientific classification
- Kingdom: Animalia
- Phylum: Arthropoda
- Class: Insecta
- Order: Coleoptera
- Suborder: Polyphaga
- Infraorder: Cucujiformia
- Family: Cerambycidae
- Genus: Hamatastus
- Species: H. fasciatus

Binomial name
- Hamatastus fasciatus Glimour, 1957

Species of beetle

Hamatastus fasciatus is a species of longhorn beetle in the family Cerambycidae. It was described by Glimour in 1957.
