= Myromeus =

Scientific classification
- Kingdom: Animalia
- Phylum: Arthropoda
- Class: Insecta
- Order: Coleoptera
- Suborder: Polyphaga
- Infraorder: Cucujiformia
- Family: Cerambycidae
- Tribe: Acanthocinini
- Genus: Myromeus

Genus of beetles

Myromeus is a genus of beetles in the family Cerambycidae, containing the following species:

- Myromeus fulvonotatus (Fisher, 1925)
- Myromeus gilmouri Breuning, 1962
- Myromeus immaculicollis Heller, 1924
- Myromeus luzonicus Fisher, 1925
- Myromeus subpictus Pascoe, 1864
