= Myromeus subpictus =

Scientific classification
- Kingdom: Animalia
- Phylum: Arthropoda
- Clade: Pancrustacea
- Class: Insecta
- Order: Coleoptera
- Suborder: Polyphaga
- Infraorder: Cucujiformia
- Family: Cerambycidae
- Genus: Myromeus
- Species: M. subpictus

Binomial name
- Myromeus subpictus Pascoe, 1864

Species of beetle

Myromeus subpictus is a species of beetle in the family Cerambycidae. It was described by Pascoe in 1864.
