= Myromeus gilmouri =

Scientific classification
- Kingdom: Animalia
- Phylum: Arthropoda
- Class: Insecta
- Order: Coleoptera
- Suborder: Polyphaga
- Infraorder: Cucujiformia
- Family: Cerambycidae
- Genus: Myromeus
- Species: M. gilmouri

Binomial name
- Myromeus gilmouri Breuning, 1962

Species of beetle

Myromeus gilmouri is a species of beetle in the family Cerambycidae. It was described by Breuning in 1962.
