= Myromeus luzonicus =

Scientific classification
- Kingdom: Animalia
- Phylum: Arthropoda
- Class: Insecta
- Order: Coleoptera
- Suborder: Polyphaga
- Infraorder: Cucujiformia
- Family: Cerambycidae
- Genus: Myromeus
- Species: M. luzonicus

Binomial name
- Myromeus luzonicus Fisher, 1925

Species of beetle

Myromeus luzonicus is a species of beetle in the family Cerambycidae. It was described by Fisher in 1925.
