= Myromeus fulvonotatus =

Scientific classification
- Kingdom: Animalia
- Phylum: Arthropoda
- Class: Insecta
- Order: Coleoptera
- Suborder: Polyphaga
- Infraorder: Cucujiformia
- Family: Cerambycidae
- Genus: Myromeus
- Species: M. fulvonotatus

Binomial name
- Myromeus fulvonotatus (Fisher, 1925)

Species of beetle

Myromeus fulvonotatus is a species of beetle in the family Cerambycidae. It was described by Fisher in 1925.
