= Myromeus immaculicollis =

Scientific classification
- Kingdom: Animalia
- Phylum: Arthropoda
- Class: Insecta
- Order: Coleoptera
- Suborder: Polyphaga
- Infraorder: Cucujiformia
- Family: Cerambycidae
- Genus: Myromeus
- Species: M. immaculicollis

Binomial name
- Myromeus immaculicollis Heller, 1924

Species of beetle

Myromeus immaculicollis is a species of beetle in the family Cerambycidae. It was described by Heller in 1924.
