= Pseudastylopsis nebulosus =

Scientific classification
- Domain: Eukaryota
- Kingdom: Animalia
- Phylum: Arthropoda
- Class: Insecta
- Order: Coleoptera
- Suborder: Polyphaga
- Infraorder: Cucujiformia
- Family: Cerambycidae
- Genus: Pseudastylopsis
- Species: P. nebulosus

Binomial name
- Pseudastylopsis nebulosus (Horn, 1880)

Species of beetle

Pseudastylopsis nebulosus is a species of beetle in the family Cerambycidae. It was described by George Henry Horn in 1880.
