= Pseudastylopsis =

Scientific classification
- Domain: Eukaryota
- Kingdom: Animalia
- Phylum: Arthropoda
- Class: Insecta
- Order: Coleoptera
- Suborder: Polyphaga
- Infraorder: Cucujiformia
- Family: Cerambycidae
- Tribe: Acanthocinini
- Genus: Pseudastylopsis; Dillon, 1956

Genus of beetles

Pseudastylopsis is a genus of longhorn beetles of the subfamily Lamiinae. It was described by Dillon in 1956.

== Species ==
- Pseudastylopsis nebulosus (Horn, 1880)
- Pseudastylopsis nelsoni Linsley and Chemsak, 1995
- Pseudastylopsis pini (Schaeffer, 1905)
- Pseudastylopsis squamosus Chemsak & Linsley, 1986
