= Pseudastylopsis nelsoni =

Scientific classification
- Domain: Eukaryota
- Kingdom: Animalia
- Phylum: Arthropoda
- Class: Insecta
- Order: Coleoptera
- Suborder: Polyphaga
- Infraorder: Cucujiformia
- Family: Cerambycidae
- Genus: Pseudastylopsis
- Species: P. nelsoni

Binomial name
- Pseudastylopsis nelsoni Linsley and Chemsak, 1995

Species of beetle

Pseudastylopsis nelsoni is a species of beetle in the family Cerambycidae. It was described by Linsley and Chemsak in 1995.
