= Pseudastylopsis pini =

Scientific classification
- Domain: Eukaryota
- Kingdom: Animalia
- Phylum: Arthropoda
- Class: Insecta
- Order: Coleoptera
- Suborder: Polyphaga
- Infraorder: Cucujiformia
- Family: Cerambycidae
- Genus: Pseudastylopsis
- Species: P. pini

Binomial name
- Pseudastylopsis pini (Schaeffer, 1905)

Species of beetle

Pseudastylopsis pini is a species of beetle in the family Cerambycidae. It was described by Schaeffer in 1905.
