= Pseudastylopsis squamosus =

Scientific classification
- Domain: Eukaryota
- Kingdom: Animalia
- Phylum: Arthropoda
- Class: Insecta
- Order: Coleoptera
- Suborder: Polyphaga
- Infraorder: Cucujiformia
- Family: Cerambycidae
- Genus: Pseudastylopsis
- Species: P. squamosus

Binomial name
- Pseudastylopsis squamosus Chemsak & Linsley, 1986

Species of beetle

Pseudastylopsis squamosus is a species of beetle in the family Cerambycidae. It was described by Chemsak and Linsley in 1986.
