= Palame anceps =

Scientific classification
- Kingdom: Animalia
- Phylum: Arthropoda
- Class: Insecta
- Order: Coleoptera
- Suborder: Polyphaga
- Infraorder: Cucujiformia
- Family: Cerambycidae
- Genus: Palame
- Species: P. anceps

Binomial name
- Palame anceps (Bates, 1864)

Species of beetle

Palame anceps is a species of beetle in the family Cerambycidae. It was described by Bates in 1864.
