= Palame =

Scientific classification
- Kingdom: Animalia
- Phylum: Arthropoda
- Class: Insecta
- Order: Coleoptera
- Suborder: Polyphaga
- Infraorder: Cucujiformia
- Family: Cerambycidae
- Tribe: Acanthocinini
- Genus: Palame

Genus of beetles

Palame is a genus of beetles in the family Cerambycidae, containing the following species:

- Palame aeruginosa Monné, 1985
- Palame anceps (Bates, 1864)
- Palame crassimana Bates, 1864
- Palame mimetica Monné, 1985
- Palame vitticolle (Bates, 1864)
