= Palame crassimana =

Scientific classification
- Kingdom: Animalia
- Phylum: Arthropoda
- Class: Insecta
- Order: Coleoptera
- Suborder: Polyphaga
- Infraorder: Cucujiformia
- Family: Cerambycidae
- Genus: Palame
- Species: P. crassimana

Binomial name
- Palame crassimana Bates, 1864

Species of beetle

Palame crassimana is a species of beetle in the family Cerambycidae. It was described by Bates in 1864.
