= Palame vitticolle =

Scientific classification
- Kingdom: Animalia
- Phylum: Arthropoda
- Class: Insecta
- Order: Coleoptera
- Suborder: Polyphaga
- Infraorder: Cucujiformia
- Family: Cerambycidae
- Genus: Palame
- Species: P. vitticolle

Binomial name
- Palame vitticolle (Bates, 1864)

Species of beetle

Palame vitticolle is a species of beetle in the family Cerambycidae. It was described by Bates in 1864.
