= Palame mimetica =

Scientific classification
- Kingdom: Animalia
- Phylum: Arthropoda
- Class: Insecta
- Order: Coleoptera
- Suborder: Polyphaga
- Infraorder: Cucujiformia
- Family: Cerambycidae
- Genus: Palame
- Species: P. mimetica

Binomial name
- Palame mimetica Monné, 1985

Species of beetle

Palame mimetica is a species of beetle in the family Cerambycidae. It was described by Monné in 1985.
