= Alphinellus =

Scientific classification
- Kingdom: Animalia
- Phylum: Arthropoda
- Class: Insecta
- Order: Coleoptera
- Suborder: Polyphaga
- Infraorder: Cucujiformia
- Family: Cerambycidae
- Tribe: Acanthocinini
- Genus: Alphinellus

Genus of beetles

Alphinellus is a genus of beetles in the family Cerambycidae, containing the following species:

- Alphinellus carinipennis Bates, 1885
- Alphinellus gibbicollis Bates, 1881
- Alphinellus minimus Bates, 1881
- Alphinellus subcornutus Bates, 1881
