= Alphinellus carinipennis =

Scientific classification
- Kingdom: Animalia
- Phylum: Arthropoda
- Class: Insecta
- Order: Coleoptera
- Suborder: Polyphaga
- Infraorder: Cucujiformia
- Family: Cerambycidae
- Genus: Alphinellus
- Species: A. carinipennis

Binomial name
- Alphinellus carinipennis Bates, 1885

Species of beetle

Alphinellus carinipennis is a species of longhorn beetles of the subfamily Lamiinae. It was described by Henry Walter Bates in 1885, and is known from Mexico.
