= Alphinellus minimus =

Scientific classification
- Kingdom: Animalia
- Phylum: Arthropoda
- Class: Insecta
- Order: Coleoptera
- Suborder: Polyphaga
- Infraorder: Cucujiformia
- Family: Cerambycidae
- Genus: Alphinellus
- Species: A. minimus

Binomial name
- Alphinellus minimus Bates, 1881

Species of beetle

Alphinellus minimus is a species of longhorn beetles of the subfamily Lamiinae. It was described by Henry Walter Bates in 1881, and is known from Guatemala.
