= Exocentroides flavipennis =

Scientific classification
- Kingdom: Animalia
- Phylum: Arthropoda
- Class: Insecta
- Order: Coleoptera
- Suborder: Polyphaga
- Infraorder: Cucujiformia
- Family: Cerambycidae
- Genus: Exocentroides
- Species: E. flavipennis

Binomial name
- Exocentroides flavipennis Breuning, 1957

Species of beetle

Exocentroides flavipennis is a species of beetle in the family Cerambycidae that was described by Breuning in 1957.
