= Exocentroides unispinicollis =

Scientific classification
- Kingdom: Animalia
- Phylum: Arthropoda
- Class: Insecta
- Order: Coleoptera
- Suborder: Polyphaga
- Infraorder: Cucujiformia
- Family: Cerambycidae
- Genus: Exocentroides
- Species: E. unispinicollis

Binomial name
- Exocentroides unispinicollis Breuning, 1957

Species of beetle

Exocentroides unispinicollis is a species of beetle in the family Cerambycidae. It was described by Breuning in 1957.
