= Exocentroides =

Scientific classification
- Kingdom: Animalia
- Phylum: Arthropoda
- Class: Insecta
- Order: Coleoptera
- Suborder: Polyphaga
- Infraorder: Cucujiformia
- Family: Cerambycidae
- Subfamily: Lamiinae
- Tribe: Acanthocinini
- Genus: Exocentroides; Breuning, 1957

Genus of beetles

Exocentroides is a genus of beetles in the family Cerambycidae, containing the following species:

subgenus Exocentroides

- Exocentroides flavovarius Breuning, 1957
- Exocentroides multispinicollis Breuning, 1957
- Exocentroides unispinicollis Breuning, 1957

subgenus Trichexocentroides

- Exocentroides flavipennis Breuning, 1957
