= Nyssodrysilla =

Scientific classification
- Kingdom: Animalia
- Phylum: Arthropoda
- Class: Insecta
- Order: Coleoptera
- Suborder: Polyphaga
- Infraorder: Cucujiformia
- Family: Cerambycidae
- Tribe: Acanthocinini
- Genus: Nyssodrysilla

Genus of beetles

Nyssodrysilla is a genus of beetles in the family Cerambycidae, containing the following species:

- Nyssodrysilla irrorata (Melzer, 1927)
- Nyssodrysilla lineata Gilmour, 1962
- Nyssodrysilla vittata (Melzer, 1934)
