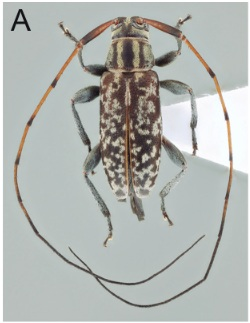

Scientific classification
- Kingdom: Animalia
- Phylum: Arthropoda
- Clade: Pancrustacea
- Class: Insecta
- Order: Coleoptera
- Suborder: Polyphaga
- Infraorder: Cucujiformia
- Family: Cerambycidae
- Genus: Nyssodrysilla
- Species: N. irrorata

Binomial name
- Nyssodrysilla irrorata (Melzer, 1927)

Synonyms
- Nyssodrys irrorata Melzer, 1927

= Nyssodrysilla irrorata =

Species of beetle

Nyssodrysilla irrorata is a species of beetle in the family Cerambycidae. It was described by Melzer in 1927. It is found in Brazil (Bahia, Minas Gerais, Espirito Santo, Rio de Janeiro, São Paulo, Paraná, Santa Catarina, Rio Grande do Sul) and Paraguay.
