= Piezochaerus =

Scientific classification
- Kingdom: Animalia
- Phylum: Arthropoda
- Class: Insecta
- Order: Coleoptera
- Suborder: Polyphaga
- Infraorder: Cucujiformia
- Family: Cerambycidae
- Tribe: Acanthocinini
- Genus: Piezochaerus

Genus of beetles

Piezochaerus is a genus of beetles in the family Cerambycidae, containing the following species:

- Piezochaerus bondari Melzer, 1932
- Piezochaerus marcelae Mermudes, 2008
- Piezochaerus melzeri Mermudes, 2008
- Piezochaerus monnei Mermudes, 2008
