= Piezochaerus monnei =

Scientific classification
- Kingdom: Animalia
- Phylum: Arthropoda
- Class: Insecta
- Order: Coleoptera
- Suborder: Polyphaga
- Infraorder: Cucujiformia
- Family: Cerambycidae
- Genus: Piezochaerus
- Species: P. monnei

Binomial name
- Piezochaerus monnei Mermudes, 2008

Species of beetle

Piezochaerus monnei is a species of beetle in the family Cerambycidae. It was described by Mermudes in 2008.
