= Piezochaerus bondari =

Scientific classification
- Kingdom: Animalia
- Phylum: Arthropoda
- Class: Insecta
- Order: Coleoptera
- Suborder: Polyphaga
- Infraorder: Cucujiformia
- Family: Cerambycidae
- Genus: Piezochaerus
- Species: P. bondari

Binomial name
- Piezochaerus bondari Melzer, 1932

Species of beetle

Piezochaerus bondari is a species of beetle in the family Cerambycidae. It was described by Melzer in 1932.
