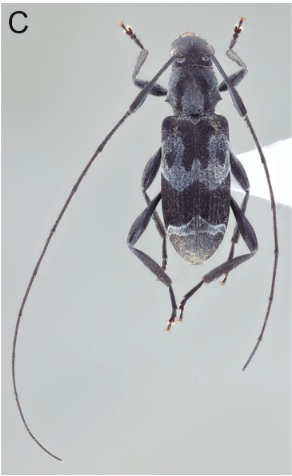

Scientific classification
- Kingdom: Animalia
- Phylum: Arthropoda
- Clade: Pancrustacea
- Class: Insecta
- Order: Coleoptera
- Suborder: Polyphaga
- Infraorder: Cucujiformia
- Family: Cerambycidae
- Genus: Microplia
- Species: M. nigra

Binomial name
- Microplia nigra Monné, 1976

= Microplia nigra =

Species of beetle

Microplia nigra is a species of beetle in the family Cerambycidae. It was described by Monné in 1976. It is found in Brazil (Bahia, Minas Gerais, São Paulo, Paraná) and Argentina and Bolivia.
