= Microplia =

Scientific classification
- Domain: Eukaryota
- Kingdom: Animalia
- Phylum: Arthropoda
- Class: Insecta
- Order: Coleoptera
- Suborder: Polyphaga
- Infraorder: Cucujiformia
- Family: Cerambycidae
- Tribe: Acanthocinini
- Genus: Microplia

Genus of beetles

Microplia is a genus of beetles in the family Cerambycidae, containing the following species:

- Microplia agilis Audinet-Serville, 1835
- Microplia nigra Monné, 1976
