= Alcathousites asperipennis =

Scientific classification
- Kingdom: Animalia
- Phylum: Arthropoda
- Class: Insecta
- Order: Coleoptera
- Suborder: Polyphaga
- Infraorder: Cucujiformia
- Family: Cerambycidae
- Genus: Alcathousites
- Species: A. asperipennis

Binomial name
- Alcathousites asperipennis (Fairmaire & Germain, 1859)

Species of beetle

Alcathousites asperipennis is a species of longhorn beetles of the subfamily Lamiinae. It was described by Fairmaire and Germain in 1859, and is known from Chile and Peru.
