= Alcathousites superstes =

Scientific classification
- Kingdom: Animalia
- Phylum: Arthropoda
- Class: Insecta
- Order: Coleoptera
- Suborder: Polyphaga
- Infraorder: Cucujiformia
- Family: Cerambycidae
- Genus: Alcathousites
- Species: A. superstes

Binomial name
- Alcathousites superstes (Erichson, 1847)

Species of beetle

Alcathousites superstes is a species of longhorn beetles of the subfamily Lamiinae. It was described by Wilhelm Ferdinand Erichson in 1847, and is known from Peru and Ecuador.
