= Alcathousites senticosus =

Scientific classification
- Kingdom: Animalia
- Phylum: Arthropoda
- Class: Insecta
- Order: Coleoptera
- Suborder: Polyphaga
- Infraorder: Cucujiformia
- Family: Cerambycidae
- Genus: Alcathousites
- Species: A. senticosus

Binomial name
- Alcathousites senticosus Monné & Martins, 1976

Species of beetle

Alcathousites senticosus is a species of longhorn beetles of the subfamily Lamiinae. It was described by Monné and Martins in 1976, and is known from Peru.
