= Alcathousites =

Scientific classification
- Kingdom: Animalia
- Phylum: Arthropoda
- Class: Insecta
- Order: Coleoptera
- Suborder: Polyphaga
- Infraorder: Cucujiformia
- Family: Cerambycidae
- Tribe: Acanthocinini
- Genus: Alcathousites

Genus of beetles

Alcathousites is a genus of beetles in the family Cerambycidae, containing the following species:

- Alcathousites asperipennis (Fairmaire & Germain, 1859)
- Alcathousites senticosus Monné & Martins, 1976
- Alcathousites superstes (Erichson, 1847)
