= Eleothinus =

Scientific classification
- Kingdom: Animalia
- Phylum: Arthropoda
- Class: Insecta
- Order: Coleoptera
- Suborder: Polyphaga
- Infraorder: Cucujiformia
- Family: Cerambycidae
- Tribe: Acanthocinini
- Genus: Eleothinus

Genus of beetles

Eleothinus is a genus of beetles in the family Cerambycidae, containing the following species:

- Eleothinus abstrusus Bates, 1881
- Eleothinus longulus Bates, 1881
- Eleothinus pygmaeus Bates, 1885
