= Eleothinus pygmaeus =

Scientific classification
- Kingdom: Animalia
- Phylum: Arthropoda
- Class: Insecta
- Order: Coleoptera
- Suborder: Polyphaga
- Infraorder: Cucujiformia
- Family: Cerambycidae
- Genus: Eleothinus
- Species: E. pygmaeus

Binomial name
- Eleothinus pygmaeus Bates, 1885

Species of beetle

Eleothinus pygmaeus is a species of longhorn beetles of the subfamily Lamiinae. It was described by Henry Walter Bates in 1885, and is known from Honduras, and from Guatemala to Panama.
