= Exalcidion carenatum =

Scientific classification
- Kingdom: Animalia
- Phylum: Arthropoda
- Class: Insecta
- Order: Coleoptera
- Suborder: Polyphaga
- Infraorder: Cucujiformia
- Family: Cerambycidae
- Genus: Exalcidion
- Species: E. carenatum

Binomial name
- Exalcidion carenatum Monné, 1990

Species of beetle

Exalcidion carenatum is a species of longhorn beetles of the subfamily Lamiinae. It was described by Miguel A. Monné in 1990, and is known from Colombia.
