= Exalcidion =

Scientific classification
- Kingdom: Animalia
- Phylum: Arthropoda
- Class: Insecta
- Order: Coleoptera
- Suborder: Polyphaga
- Infraorder: Cucujiformia
- Family: Cerambycidae
- Tribe: Acanthocinini
- Genus: Exalcidion

Genus of beetles

Exalcidion is a genus of beetles in the family Cerambycidae, containing the following species:

- Exalcidion carenatum Monné, 1990
- Exalcidion tetracanthum Monné & Delfino, 1981
- Exalcidion tetramaston (White, 1855)
