= Exalcidion tetracanthum =

Scientific classification
- Kingdom: Animalia
- Phylum: Arthropoda
- Class: Insecta
- Order: Coleoptera
- Suborder: Polyphaga
- Infraorder: Cucujiformia
- Family: Cerambycidae
- Genus: Exalcidion
- Species: E. tetracanthum

Binomial name
- Exalcidion tetracanthum Monné & Delfino, 1981

Species of beetle

Exalcidion tetracanthum is a species of longhorn beetles of the subfamily Lamiinae. It was described by Monné and Delfino in 1981, and is known from Peru.
