= Exalcidion tetramaston =

Scientific classification
- Kingdom: Animalia
- Phylum: Arthropoda
- Clade: Pancrustacea
- Class: Insecta
- Order: Coleoptera
- Suborder: Polyphaga
- Infraorder: Cucujiformia
- Family: Cerambycidae
- Genus: Exalcidion
- Species: E. tetramaston

Binomial name
- Exalcidion tetramaston (White, 1855)

Species of beetle

Exalcidion tetramaston is a species of longhorn beetles of the subfamily Lamiinae. It was described by White in 1855 and is known from Venezuela.
