= Atelographus decoratus =

Scientific classification
- Kingdom: Animalia
- Phylum: Arthropoda
- Class: Insecta
- Order: Coleoptera
- Suborder: Polyphaga
- Infraorder: Cucujiformia
- Family: Cerambycidae
- Genus: Atelographus
- Species: A. decoratus

Binomial name
- Atelographus decoratus Monne & Monne, 2011

Species of beetle

Atelographus decoratus is a species of longhorn beetles of the subfamily Lamiinae. It was described by Monne and Monne in 2011, and is known from Brazil.
