= Atelographus susanae =

Scientific classification
- Kingdom: Animalia
- Phylum: Arthropoda
- Class: Insecta
- Order: Coleoptera
- Suborder: Polyphaga
- Infraorder: Cucujiformia
- Family: Cerambycidae
- Genus: Atelographus
- Species: A. susanae

Binomial name
- Atelographus susanae Monné, 1975

Species of beetle

Atelographus susanae is a species of longhorn beetles of the subfamily Lamiinae. It was described by Monné in 1975, and is known from southeastern Brazil and northern Argentina.
