= Atelographus sexplagiatus =

Scientific classification
- Kingdom: Animalia
- Phylum: Arthropoda
- Class: Insecta
- Order: Coleoptera
- Suborder: Polyphaga
- Infraorder: Cucujiformia
- Family: Cerambycidae
- Genus: Atelographus
- Species: A. sexplagiatus

Binomial name
- Atelographus sexplagiatus Melzer, 1927

Species of beetle

Atelographus sexplagiatus is a species of longhorn beetles of the subfamily Lamiinae. It was described by Melzer in 1927, and is known from southeastern Brazil.
