= Atelographus =

Scientific classification
- Kingdom: Animalia
- Phylum: Arthropoda
- Class: Insecta
- Order: Coleoptera
- Suborder: Polyphaga
- Infraorder: Cucujiformia
- Family: Cerambycidae
- Subfamily: Lamiinae
- Tribe: Acanthocinini
- Genus: Atelographus; Melzer, 1927

Genus of beetles

Atelographus is a genus of beetles in the family Cerambycidae, containing the following species:

- Atelographus decoratus Monne & Monne, 2011
- Atelographus sexplagiatus Melzer, 1927
- Atelographus susanae Monné, 1975
