= Mimostenellipsis =

Scientific classification
- Kingdom: Animalia
- Phylum: Arthropoda
- Clade: Pancrustacea
- Class: Insecta
- Order: Coleoptera
- Suborder: Polyphaga
- Infraorder: Cucujiformia
- Family: Cerambycidae
- Tribe: Acanthocinini
- Genus: Mimostenellipsis

Genus of beetles

Mimostenellipsis is a genus of beetles in the family Cerambycidae, containing the following species:

- Mimostenellipsis albertisi Breuning, 1956
- Mimostenellipsis densepunctata (Breuning, 1963)
- Mimostenellipsis pilosa (Breuning, 1963)
