= Mimoxenolea bicoloricornis =

Scientific classification
- Kingdom: Animalia
- Phylum: Arthropoda
- Class: Insecta
- Order: Coleoptera
- Suborder: Polyphaga
- Infraorder: Cucujiformia
- Family: Cerambycidae
- Genus: Mimoxenolea
- Species: M. bicoloricornis

Binomial name
- Mimoxenolea bicoloricornis Breuning, 1960

Species of beetle

Mimoxenolea bicoloricornis is a species of beetle in the family Cerambycidae. It was described by Breuning in 1960.
