= Mimoxenolea =

Scientific classification
- Kingdom: Animalia
- Phylum: Arthropoda
- Class: Insecta
- Order: Coleoptera
- Suborder: Polyphaga
- Infraorder: Cucujiformia
- Family: Cerambycidae
- Tribe: Acanthocinini
- Genus: Mimoxenolea

Genus of beetles

Mimoxenolea is a genus of beetles in the family Cerambycidae, containing the following species:

- Mimoxenolea bicoloricornis Breuning, 1960
- Mimoxenolea ornata (Breuning, 1961)
- Mimoxenolea sikkimensis (Breuning, 1961)
