= Paracartus fasciculosus =

Scientific classification
- Kingdom: Animalia
- Phylum: Arthropoda
- Class: Insecta
- Order: Coleoptera
- Suborder: Polyphaga
- Infraorder: Cucujiformia
- Family: Cerambycidae
- Genus: Paracartus
- Species: P. fasciculosus

Binomial name
- Paracartus fasciculosus Hunt & Breuning, 1957

Species of beetle

Paracartus fasciculosus is a species of beetle in the family Cerambycidae indigenous to South Africa. It was described by Hunt and Breuning in 1957.
