= Paracartus coffini =

Scientific classification
- Domain: Eukaryota
- Kingdom: Animalia
- Phylum: Arthropoda
- Class: Insecta
- Order: Coleoptera
- Suborder: Polyphaga
- Infraorder: Cucujiformia
- Family: Cerambycidae
- Genus: Paracartus
- Species: P. coffini

Binomial name
- Paracartus coffini Téocchi, 1991

Species of beetle

Paracartus coffini is a species of beetle in the family Cerambycidae. It was described by Téocchi in 1991.
