= Paracartus =

Scientific classification
- Domain: Eukaryota
- Kingdom: Animalia
- Phylum: Arthropoda
- Class: Insecta
- Order: Coleoptera
- Suborder: Polyphaga
- Infraorder: Cucujiformia
- Family: Cerambycidae
- Tribe: Acanthocinini
- Genus: Paracartus

Genus of beetles

Paracartus is a genus of beetles in the family Cerambycidae, containing the following species:

- Paracartus aureovitticollis Breuning, 1958
- Paracartus coffini Téocchi, 1991
- Paracartus fasciculosus Hunt & Breuning, 1957
