= Ombrosaga boettcheri =

Scientific classification
- Kingdom: Animalia
- Phylum: Arthropoda
- Class: Insecta
- Order: Coleoptera
- Suborder: Polyphaga
- Infraorder: Cucujiformia
- Family: Cerambycidae
- Genus: Ombrosaga
- Species: O. boettcheri

Binomial name
- Ombrosaga boettcheri Aurivillius, 1922

Species of beetle

Ombrosaga boettcheri is a species of beetle in the family Cerambycidae. It was described by Per Olof Christopher Aurivillius in 1922.
