= Ombrosaga delkeskampi =

Scientific classification
- Kingdom: Animalia
- Phylum: Arthropoda
- Class: Insecta
- Order: Coleoptera
- Suborder: Polyphaga
- Infraorder: Cucujiformia
- Family: Cerambycidae
- Genus: Ombrosaga
- Species: O. delkeskampi

Binomial name
- Ombrosaga delkeskampi Breuning, 1959

Species of beetle

Ombrosaga delkeskampi is a species of beetle in the family Cerambycidae. It was described by Breuning in 1959.
