= Ombrosaga =

Scientific classification
- Kingdom: Animalia
- Phylum: Arthropoda
- Class: Insecta
- Order: Coleoptera
- Suborder: Polyphaga
- Infraorder: Cucujiformia
- Family: Cerambycidae
- Tribe: Acanthocinini
- Genus: Ombrosaga

Genus of beetles

Ombrosaga is a genus of beetles in the family Cerambycidae, containing the following species:

- Ombrosaga boettcheri Aurivillius, 1922
- Ombrosaga delkeskampi Breuning, 1959
- Ombrosaga maculosa Pascoe, 1864
