= Ombrosaga maculosa =

Scientific classification
- Kingdom: Animalia
- Phylum: Arthropoda
- Class: Insecta
- Order: Coleoptera
- Suborder: Polyphaga
- Infraorder: Cucujiformia
- Family: Cerambycidae
- Genus: Ombrosaga
- Species: O. maculosa

Binomial name
- Ombrosaga maculosa Pascoe, 1864

Species of beetle

Ombrosaga maculosa is a species of beetle in the family Cerambycidae. It was described by Pascoe in 1864.
