= Mimexocentrus =

Scientific classification
- Kingdom: Animalia
- Phylum: Arthropoda
- Class: Insecta
- Order: Coleoptera
- Suborder: Polyphaga
- Infraorder: Cucujiformia
- Family: Cerambycidae
- Tribe: Acanthocinini
- Genus: Mimexocentrus

Genus of beetles

Mimexocentrus is a genus of beetles in the family Cerambycidae, containing the following species:

- Mimexocentrus medioalbus Breuning, 1957
- Mimexocentrus perrieri Breuning, 1957
- Mimexocentrus seminiveus Breuning, 1957
