= Baryssiniella =

Scientific classification
- Domain: Eukaryota
- Kingdom: Animalia
- Phylum: Arthropoda
- Class: Insecta
- Order: Coleoptera
- Suborder: Polyphaga
- Infraorder: Cucujiformia
- Family: Cerambycidae
- Subfamily: Lamiinae
- Tribe: Acanthocinini
- Genus: Baryssiniella; Berkov & Monné, 2010

Genus of beetles

Baryssiniella is a genus of long-horned beetles in the family Cerambycidae. There are at least two described species in Baryssiniella, found in South America.

== Species ==
These two species belong to the genus Baryssiniella:

- Baryssiniella hieroglyphica Berkov & Monné, 2010 (Brazil, French Guiana, and Peru)
- Baryssiniella tavakiliani Berkov & Monné, 2010 (French Guiana)
