= Baryssiniella hieroglyphica =

Scientific classification
- Kingdom: Animalia
- Phylum: Arthropoda
- Class: Insecta
- Order: Coleoptera
- Suborder: Polyphaga
- Infraorder: Cucujiformia
- Family: Cerambycidae
- Subfamily: Lamiinae
- Tribe: Acanthocinini
- Genus: Baryssiniella
- Species: B. hieroglyphica

Binomial name
- Baryssiniella hieroglyphica Berkov & Monne, 2010

Species of beetle

Baryssiniella hieroglyphica is a species of longhorn beetles of the subfamily Lamiinae. It was described by Berkov and Monne in 2010, and is known from Peru.
