= Oectropsis latifrons =

Scientific classification
- Kingdom: Animalia
- Phylum: Arthropoda
- Class: Insecta
- Order: Coleoptera
- Suborder: Polyphaga
- Infraorder: Cucujiformia
- Family: Cerambycidae
- Genus: Oectropsis
- Species: O. latifrons

Binomial name
- Oectropsis latifrons Blanchard in Gay, 1851

Species of beetle

Oectropsis latifrons is a species of beetle in the family Cerambycidae. It was described by Blanchard in 1851.
