= Oectropsis =

Scientific classification
- Kingdom: Animalia
- Phylum: Arthropoda
- Class: Insecta
- Order: Coleoptera
- Suborder: Polyphaga
- Infraorder: Cucujiformia
- Family: Cerambycidae
- Tribe: Acanthocinini
- Genus: Oectropsis

Genus of beetles

Oectropsis is a genus of beetles in the family Cerambycidae, containing the following species:

- Oectropsis franciscae Barriga & Cepeda, 2006
- Oectropsis latifrons Blanchard in Gay, 1851
- Oectropsis pusillus (Blanchard in Gay, 1851)
