= Oectropsis pusillus =

Scientific classification
- Kingdom: Animalia
- Phylum: Arthropoda
- Class: Insecta
- Order: Coleoptera
- Suborder: Polyphaga
- Infraorder: Cucujiformia
- Family: Cerambycidae
- Genus: Oectropsis
- Species: O. pusillus

Binomial name
- Oectropsis pusillus (Blanchard in Gay, 1851)

Species of beetle

Oectropsis pusillus is a species of beetle in the family Cerambycidae. It was described by Blanchard in 1851.
