= Oectropsis franciscae =

Scientific classification
- Kingdom: Animalia
- Phylum: Arthropoda
- Class: Insecta
- Order: Coleoptera
- Suborder: Polyphaga
- Infraorder: Cucujiformia
- Family: Cerambycidae
- Genus: Oectropsis
- Species: O. franciscae

Binomial name
- Oectropsis franciscae Barriga & Cepeda, 2006

Species of beetle

Oectropsis franciscae is a species of beetle in the family Cerambycidae. It was described by Barriga and Cepeda in 2006.
