= Nyssocarinus bondari =

Scientific classification
- Kingdom: Animalia
- Phylum: Arthropoda
- Class: Insecta
- Order: Coleoptera
- Suborder: Polyphaga
- Infraorder: Cucujiformia
- Family: Cerambycidae
- Genus: Nyssocarinus
- Species: N. bondari

Binomial name
- Nyssocarinus bondari (Melzer, 1927)

Species of beetle

Nyssocarinus bondari is a species of beetle in the family Cerambycidae. It was described by Melzer in 1927.
