= Nyssocarinus =

Scientific classification
- Kingdom: Animalia
- Phylum: Arthropoda
- Class: Insecta
- Order: Coleoptera
- Suborder: Polyphaga
- Infraorder: Cucujiformia
- Family: Cerambycidae
- Tribe: Acanthocinini
- Genus: Nyssocarinus

Genus of beetles

Nyssocarinus is a genus of beetles in the family Cerambycidae, containing the following species:

- Nyssocarinus bondari (Melzer, 1927)
- Nyssocarinus humeralis Monné, 1985
- Nyssocarinus vittatus Gilmour, 1960
