= Nyssocarinus humeralis =

Scientific classification
- Kingdom: Animalia
- Phylum: Arthropoda
- Class: Insecta
- Order: Coleoptera
- Suborder: Polyphaga
- Infraorder: Cucujiformia
- Family: Cerambycidae
- Genus: Nyssocarinus
- Species: N. humeralis

Binomial name
- Nyssocarinus humeralis Monné, 1985

Species of beetle

Nyssocarinus humeralis is a species of beetle in the family Cerambycidae. It was described by Monné in 1985.
