= Micurus obliquatus =

Scientific classification
- Kingdom: Animalia
- Phylum: Arthropoda
- Class: Insecta
- Order: Coleoptera
- Suborder: Polyphaga
- Infraorder: Cucujiformia
- Family: Cerambycidae
- Genus: Micurus
- Species: M. obliquatus

Binomial name
- Micurus obliquatus Fairmaire, 1903

Species of beetle

Micurus obliquatus is a species of beetle in the family Cerambycidae. It was described by Fairmaire in 1903.
