= Micurus =

Scientific classification
- Kingdom: Animalia
- Phylum: Arthropoda
- Class: Insecta
- Order: Coleoptera
- Suborder: Polyphaga
- Infraorder: Cucujiformia
- Family: Cerambycidae
- Tribe: Acanthocinini
- Genus: Micurus

Genus of beetles

Micurus is a genus of beetles in the family Cerambycidae, containing the following species:

- Micurus affinis Breuning, 1975
- Micurus asperipennis Fairmaire, 1896
- Micurus obliquatus Fairmaire, 1903
