= Micurus asperipennis =

Scientific classification
- Kingdom: Animalia
- Phylum: Arthropoda
- Class: Insecta
- Order: Coleoptera
- Suborder: Polyphaga
- Infraorder: Cucujiformia
- Family: Cerambycidae
- Genus: Micurus
- Species: M. asperipennis

Binomial name
- Micurus asperipennis Fairmaire, 1896

Species of beetle

Micurus asperipennis is a species of beetle in the family Cerambycidae. It was described by Fairmaire in 1896.
