= Carphontes posticalis =

Scientific classification
- Kingdom: Animalia
- Phylum: Arthropoda
- Class: Insecta
- Order: Coleoptera
- Suborder: Polyphaga
- Infraorder: Cucujiformia
- Family: Cerambycidae
- Genus: Carphontes
- Species: C. posticalis

Binomial name
- Carphontes posticalis Bates, 1881

Species of beetle

Carphontes posticalis is a species of longhorn beetles of the subfamily Lamiinae. It was described by Bates in 1881, and is known from southern Mexico to Panama, as well as Brazil, Ecuador, French Guiana, and Bolivia.
