= Carphontes =

Scientific classification
- Kingdom: Animalia
- Phylum: Arthropoda
- Class: Insecta
- Order: Coleoptera
- Suborder: Polyphaga
- Infraorder: Cucujiformia
- Family: Cerambycidae
- Tribe: Acanthocinini
- Genus: Carphontes

Genus of beetles

Carphontes is a genus of beetle in the family Cerambycidae, containing the following species:

- Carphontes paradoxus Monne & Monne, 2010
- Carphontes posticalis Bates, 1881
