= Carphontes paradoxus =

Scientific classification
- Kingdom: Animalia
- Phylum: Arthropoda
- Class: Insecta
- Order: Coleoptera
- Suborder: Polyphaga
- Infraorder: Cucujiformia
- Family: Cerambycidae
- Genus: Carphontes
- Species: C. paradoxus

Binomial name
- Carphontes paradoxus Monne & Monne, 2010

Species of beetle

Carphontes paradoxus is a species of longhorn beetles of the subfamily Lamiinae. It was described by Monne and Monne in 2010, and is known from Venezuela.

== Description and distribution ==
Carphontes paradoxus is native to Central and South America. Its known range includes Mexico (specifically the state of Veracruz), Guatemala, and Brazil. As a member of the subfamily Lamiinae, it is characterized by its long antennae and specialized wood-boring larval stage.
