= Tropanisopodus =

Scientific classification
- Kingdom: Animalia
- Phylum: Arthropoda
- Class: Insecta
- Order: Coleoptera
- Suborder: Polyphaga
- Infraorder: Cucujiformia
- Family: Cerambycidae
- Tribe: Acanthocinini
- Genus: Tropanisopodus; Tippmann, 1960

Genus of beetles

Tropanisopodus is a genus of beetles in the family Cerambycidae, containing the following species:

- Tropanisopodus andinus Tippmann, 1960
- Tropanisopodus antonkozlovi Nascimento & Santos-Silva, 2019
- Tropanisopodus kozlovi Nascimento & Santos-Silva, 2019
- Tropanisopodus tachira Monne & Monne, 2007
