= Tropanisopodus tachira =

Scientific classification
- Kingdom: Animalia
- Phylum: Arthropoda
- Class: Insecta
- Order: Coleoptera
- Suborder: Polyphaga
- Infraorder: Cucujiformia
- Family: Cerambycidae
- Genus: Tropanisopodus
- Species: T. tachira

Binomial name
- Tropanisopodus tachira Monne & Monne, 2007

Species of beetle

Tropanisopodus tachira is a species of beetle in the family Cerambycidae. It was described by Monne and Monne in 2007.
