= Tomrogersia =

Scientific classification
- Domain: Eukaryota
- Kingdom: Animalia
- Phylum: Arthropoda
- Class: Insecta
- Order: Coleoptera
- Suborder: Polyphaga
- Infraorder: Cucujiformia
- Family: Cerambycidae
- Tribe: Acanthocinini
- Genus: Tomrogersia

Genus of beetles

Tomrogersia is a genus of beetles in the family Cerambycidae, containing the following species:

- Tomrogersia acanthofemorata Fragoso, 1980
- Tomrogersia villiersi Monne & Monne, 2006
