= Tomrogersia villiersi =

Scientific classification
- Domain: Eukaryota
- Kingdom: Animalia
- Phylum: Arthropoda
- Class: Insecta
- Order: Coleoptera
- Suborder: Polyphaga
- Infraorder: Cucujiformia
- Family: Cerambycidae
- Genus: Tomrogersia
- Species: T. villiersi

Binomial name
- Tomrogersia villiersi Monne & Monne, 2006

Species of beetle

Tomrogersia villiersi is a species of beetle in the family Cerambycidae. It was described by Monne and Monne in 2006.
