= Tomrogersia acanthofemorata =

Scientific classification
- Domain: Eukaryota
- Kingdom: Animalia
- Phylum: Arthropoda
- Class: Insecta
- Order: Coleoptera
- Suborder: Polyphaga
- Infraorder: Cucujiformia
- Family: Cerambycidae
- Genus: Tomrogersia
- Species: T. acanthofemorata

Binomial name
- Tomrogersia acanthofemorata Fragoso, 1980

Species of beetle

Tomrogersia acanthofemorata is a species of beetle in the family Cerambycidae. It was described by S. A. Fragoso in 1980.
