= Cleodoxus lineaticollis =

Scientific classification
- Kingdom: Animalia
- Phylum: Arthropoda
- Class: Insecta
- Order: Coleoptera
- Suborder: Polyphaga
- Infraorder: Cucujiformia
- Family: Cerambycidae
- Genus: Cleodoxus
- Species: C. lineaticollis

Binomial name
- Cleodoxus lineaticollis Gounelle, 1910

Species of beetle

Cleodoxus lineaticollis is a species of longhorn beetles of the subfamily Lamiinae. It was described by Gounelle in 1910 and is known to be native to Ecuador.
