= Cleodoxus carinatus =

Scientific classification
- Kingdom: Animalia
- Phylum: Arthropoda
- Class: Insecta
- Order: Coleoptera
- Suborder: Polyphaga
- Infraorder: Cucujiformia
- Family: Cerambycidae
- Genus: Cleodoxus
- Species: C. carinatus

Binomial name
- Cleodoxus carinatus (White, 1855)

Species of beetle

Cleodoxus carinatus is a species of longhorn beetles of the subfamily Lamiinae. It was described by White in 1855, and is known from Colombia, eastern Ecuador, northern Argentina, and Bolivia.
