= Cleodoxus =

Scientific classification
- Kingdom: Animalia
- Phylum: Arthropoda
- Class: Insecta
- Order: Coleoptera
- Suborder: Polyphaga
- Infraorder: Cucujiformia
- Family: Cerambycidae
- Tribe: Acanthocinini
- Genus: Cleodoxus

Genus of beetles

Cleodoxus is a genus of beetles in the family Cerambycidae, containing the following species:

- Cleodoxus carinatus (White, 1855)
- Cleodoxus lineaticollis Gounelle, 1910
