= Anisolophia glauca =

Scientific classification
- Kingdom: Animalia
- Phylum: Arthropoda
- Class: Insecta
- Order: Coleoptera
- Suborder: Polyphaga
- Infraorder: Cucujiformia
- Family: Cerambycidae
- Genus: Anisolophia
- Species: A. glauca

Binomial name
- Anisolophia glauca Melzer, 1934

Species of beetle

Anisolophia glauca is a species of longhorn beetles of the subfamily Lamiinae. It was described by Melzer in 1934, and is known from Brazil.
