= Anisolophia =

Scientific classification
- Kingdom: Animalia
- Phylum: Arthropoda
- Class: Insecta
- Order: Coleoptera
- Suborder: Polyphaga
- Infraorder: Cucujiformia
- Family: Cerambycidae
- Subfamily: Lamiinae
- Tribe: Acanthocinini
- Genus: Anisolophia; Melzer, 1935

Genus of beetles

Anisolophia is a genus of beetles in the family Cerambycidae, containing the following species:

- Anisolophia cultrifera (White, 1855)
- Anisolophia glauca Melzer, 1934
