= Anisolophia cultrifera =

Scientific classification
- Domain: Eukaryota
- Kingdom: Animalia
- Phylum: Arthropoda
- Class: Insecta
- Order: Coleoptera
- Suborder: Polyphaga
- Infraorder: Cucujiformia
- Family: Cerambycidae
- Genus: Anisolophia
- Species: A. cultrifera

Binomial name
- Anisolophia cultrifera (White, 1855)

Species of beetle

Anisolophia cultrifera is a species of longhorn beetles of the subfamily Lamiinae. It was described by White in 1855, and is known from Brazil.
