= Apteroleiopus =

Scientific classification
- Kingdom: Animalia
- Phylum: Arthropoda
- Class: Insecta
- Order: Coleoptera
- Suborder: Polyphaga
- Infraorder: Cucujiformia
- Family: Cerambycidae
- Subfamily: Lamiinae
- Tribe: Acanthocinini
- Genus: Apteroleiopus; Breuning, 1955

Genus of beetles

Apteroleiopus is a genus of beetles in the family Cerambycidae, containing the following species:

- Apteroleiopus apterus Breuning, 1955
- Apteroleiopus jeanneli Breuning, 1955
