= Paracleodoxus cineraceus =

Scientific classification
- Kingdom: Animalia
- Phylum: Arthropoda
- Class: Insecta
- Order: Coleoptera
- Suborder: Polyphaga
- Infraorder: Cucujiformia
- Family: Cerambycidae
- Genus: Paracleodoxus
- Species: P. cineraceus

Binomial name
- Paracleodoxus cineraceus Monne & Monne, 2010

Species of beetle

Paracleodoxus cineraceus is a species of beetle in the family Cerambycidae. It was described by Monne and Monne in 2010.
