= Paracleodoxus =

Scientific classification
- Kingdom: Animalia
- Phylum: Arthropoda
- Class: Insecta
- Order: Coleoptera
- Suborder: Polyphaga
- Infraorder: Cucujiformia
- Family: Cerambycidae
- Tribe: Acanthocinini
- Genus: Paracleodoxus

Genus of beetles

Paracleodoxus is a genus of beetles in the family Cerambycidae, containing the following species:

- Paracleodoxus cineraceus Monne & Monne, 2010
- Paracleodoxus simillimus Monne & Monne, 2010
