= Eneodes =

Scientific classification
- Kingdom: Animalia
- Phylum: Arthropoda
- Class: Insecta
- Order: Coleoptera
- Suborder: Polyphaga
- Infraorder: Cucujiformia
- Family: Cerambycidae
- Tribe: Acanthocinini
- Genus: Eneodes

Genus of beetles

Eneodes is a genus of beetles in the family Cerambycidae, containing the following species:

- Eneodes hirsuta Fisher, 1926
- Eneodes viridulus Fisher, 1942
