= Lophopoenopsis albosparsus =

Scientific classification
- Kingdom: Animalia
- Phylum: Arthropoda
- Class: Insecta
- Order: Coleoptera
- Suborder: Polyphaga
- Infraorder: Cucujiformia
- Family: Cerambycidae
- Genus: Lophopoenopsis
- Species: L. albosparsus

Binomial name
- Lophopoenopsis albosparsus Monne & Monne, 2007

Species of beetle

Lophopoenopsis albosparsus is a species of beetle in the family Cerambycidae. It was described by Monne and Monne in 2007.
