= Lophopoenopsis singularis =

Scientific classification
- Kingdom: Animalia
- Phylum: Arthropoda
- Class: Insecta
- Order: Coleoptera
- Suborder: Polyphaga
- Infraorder: Cucujiformia
- Family: Cerambycidae
- Genus: Lophopoenopsis
- Species: L. singularis

Binomial name
- Lophopoenopsis singularis Melzer, 1931

Species of beetle

Lophopoenopsis singularis is a species of beetle in the family Cerambycidae. It was described by Melzer in 1931.
