= Lophopoenopsis =

Scientific classification
- Kingdom: Animalia
- Phylum: Arthropoda
- Class: Insecta
- Order: Coleoptera
- Suborder: Polyphaga
- Infraorder: Cucujiformia
- Family: Cerambycidae
- Tribe: Acanthocinini
- Genus: Lophopoenopsis

Genus of beetles

Lophopoenopsis is a genus of beetles in the family Cerambycidae, containing the following species:

- Lophopoenopsis albosparsus Monne & Monne, 2007
- Lophopoenopsis singularis Melzer, 1931
