= Paradidymocentrus =

Scientific classification
- Domain: Eukaryota
- Kingdom: Animalia
- Phylum: Arthropoda
- Class: Insecta
- Order: Coleoptera
- Suborder: Polyphaga
- Infraorder: Cucujiformia
- Family: Cerambycidae
- Genus: Lamiinae

Genus of beetles

Paradidymocentrus is a genus of beetles in the family Cerambycidae, containing the following species:

- Paradidymocentrus maindroni Breuning, 1978
- Paradidymocentrus parterufipennis Breuning, 1956
