= Paradidymocentrus maindroni =

Scientific classification
- Kingdom: Animalia
- Phylum: Arthropoda
- Class: Insecta
- Order: Coleoptera
- Suborder: Polyphaga
- Infraorder: Cucujiformia
- Family: Cerambycidae
- Genus: Lamiinae
- Species: P. maindroni

Binomial name
- Paradidymocentrus maindroni Breuning, 1978

Species of beetle

Paradidymocentrus maindroni is a species of beetle in the family Cerambycidae. It was described by Breuning in 1978.
