= Paradidymocentrus parterufipennis =

Scientific classification
- Kingdom: Animalia
- Phylum: Arthropoda
- Class: Insecta
- Order: Coleoptera
- Suborder: Polyphaga
- Infraorder: Cucujiformia
- Family: Cerambycidae
- Genus: Lamiinae
- Species: P. parterufipennis

Binomial name
- Paradidymocentrus parterufipennis Breuning, 1956

Species of beetle

Paradidymocentrus parterufipennis is a species of beetle in the family Cerambycidae. It was described by Breuning in 1956.
