= Pseudocobelura =

Scientific classification
- Kingdom: Animalia
- Phylum: Arthropoda
- Class: Insecta
- Order: Coleoptera
- Suborder: Polyphaga
- Infraorder: Cucujiformia
- Family: Cerambycidae
- Tribe: Acanthocinini
- Genus: Pseudocobelura

Genus of beetles

Pseudocobelura is a genus of beetles in the family Cerambycidae, containing the following species:

- Pseudocobelura prolixa (Bates, 1864)
- Pseudocobelura succincta Monné & Martins, 1976
