= Pseudocobelura prolixa =

Scientific classification
- Kingdom: Animalia
- Phylum: Arthropoda
- Class: Insecta
- Order: Coleoptera
- Suborder: Polyphaga
- Infraorder: Cucujiformia
- Family: Cerambycidae
- Genus: Pseudocobelura
- Species: P. prolixa

Binomial name
- Pseudocobelura prolixa (Bates, 1864)

Species of beetle

Pseudocobelura prolixa is a species of beetle in the family Cerambycidae. It was described by Bates in 1864.
