= Pseudolepturges caesius =

Scientific classification
- Kingdom: Animalia
- Phylum: Arthropoda
- Class: Insecta
- Order: Coleoptera
- Suborder: Polyphaga
- Infraorder: Cucujiformia
- Family: Cerambycidae
- Genus: Pseudolepturges
- Species: P. caesius

Binomial name
- Pseudolepturges caesius Monne & Monne, 2007

Species of beetle

Pseudolepturges caesius is a species of beetle in the family Cerambycidae. It was described by Monne and Monne in 2007.
