= Pseudolepturges =

Scientific classification
- Kingdom: Animalia
- Phylum: Arthropoda
- Class: Insecta
- Order: Coleoptera
- Suborder: Polyphaga
- Infraorder: Cucujiformia
- Family: Cerambycidae
- Tribe: Acanthocinini
- Genus: Pseudolepturges

Genus of beetles

Pseudolepturges is a genus of beetles in the family Cerambycidae, containing the following species:

- Pseudolepturges caesius Monne & Monne, 2007
- Pseudolepturges rufulus (Bates, 1885)
