= Contoderopsis =

Scientific classification
- Kingdom: Animalia
- Phylum: Arthropoda
- Class: Insecta
- Order: Coleoptera
- Suborder: Polyphaga
- Infraorder: Cucujiformia
- Family: Cerambycidae
- Tribe: Acanthocinini
- Genus: Contoderopsis

Genus of beetles

Contoderopsis is a genus of beetles in the family Cerambycidae, containing the following species:

- Contoderopsis aurivillii Breuning, 1956
- Contoderopsis luzonica Breuning, 1970
