= Contoderopsis aurivillii =

Scientific classification
- Kingdom: Animalia
- Phylum: Arthropoda
- Class: Insecta
- Order: Coleoptera
- Suborder: Polyphaga
- Infraorder: Cucujiformia
- Family: Cerambycidae
- Genus: Contoderopsis
- Species: C. aurivillii

Binomial name
- Contoderopsis aurivillii Breuning, 1956

Species of beetle

Contoderopsis aurivillii is a species of beetle in the family Cerambycidae. It was described by Breuning in 1956. It is endemic to the Philippines.
