= Mimipochira sikkimensis =

Scientific classification
- Kingdom: Animalia
- Phylum: Arthropoda
- Class: Insecta
- Order: Coleoptera
- Suborder: Polyphaga
- Infraorder: Cucujiformia
- Family: Cerambycidae
- Genus: Mimipochira
- Species: M. sikkimensis

Binomial name
- Mimipochira sikkimensis (Breuning, 1977)

Species of beetle

Mimipochira sikkimensis is a species of beetle in the family Cerambycidae. It was described by Breuning in 1977.
