= Mimipochira =

Scientific classification
- Kingdom: Animalia
- Phylum: Arthropoda
- Class: Insecta
- Order: Coleoptera
- Suborder: Polyphaga
- Infraorder: Cucujiformia
- Family: Cerambycidae
- Tribe: Acanthocinini
- Genus: Mimipochira

Genus of beetles

Mimipochira is a genus of beetles in the family Cerambycidae. It contains the following species:

- Mimipochira fruhstorferi Breuning, 1956
- Mimipochira sikkimensis (Breuning, 1977)
