= Lepturginus obscurellus =

Scientific classification
- Kingdom: Animalia
- Phylum: Arthropoda
- Class: Insecta
- Order: Coleoptera
- Suborder: Polyphaga
- Infraorder: Cucujiformia
- Family: Cerambycidae
- Genus: Lepturginus
- Species: L. obscurellus

Binomial name
- Lepturginus obscurellus Gilmour, 1959

Species of beetle

Lepturginus obscurellus is a species of beetle in the family Cerambycidae. It was described by Gilmour in 1959.
