= Lepturginus tigrellus =

Scientific classification
- Kingdom: Animalia
- Phylum: Arthropoda
- Class: Insecta
- Order: Coleoptera
- Suborder: Polyphaga
- Infraorder: Cucujiformia
- Family: Cerambycidae
- Genus: Lepturginus
- Species: L. tigrellus

Binomial name
- Lepturginus tigrellus (Bates, 1874)

Species of beetle

Lepturginus tigrellus is a species of beetle in the family Cerambycidae. It was described by Bates in 1874.
