= Lepturginus =

Scientific classification
- Kingdom: Animalia
- Phylum: Arthropoda
- Class: Insecta
- Order: Coleoptera
- Suborder: Polyphaga
- Infraorder: Cucujiformia
- Family: Cerambycidae
- Tribe: Acanthocinini
- Genus: Lepturginus

Genus of beetles

Lepturginus is a genus of beetles in the family Cerambycidae, containing the following species:

- Lepturginus obscurellus Gilmour, 1959
- Lepturginus tigrellus (Bates, 1874)
