= Neacanista =

Scientific classification
- Kingdom: Animalia
- Phylum: Arthropoda
- Class: Insecta
- Order: Coleoptera
- Suborder: Polyphaga
- Infraorder: Cucujiformia
- Family: Cerambycidae
- Tribe: Acanthocinini
- Genus: Neacanista

Genus of beetles

Neacanista is a genus of beetles in the family Cerambycidae, containing the following species:

- Neacanista shirakii (Mitono, 1943)
- Neacanista tuberculipenne Gressitt, 1940
