= Neacanista shirakii =

Scientific classification
- Kingdom: Animalia
- Phylum: Arthropoda
- Class: Insecta
- Order: Coleoptera
- Suborder: Polyphaga
- Infraorder: Cucujiformia
- Family: Cerambycidae
- Genus: Neacanista
- Species: N. shirakii

Binomial name
- Neacanista shirakii (Mitono, 1943)

Species of beetle

Neacanista shirakii is a species of beetle in the family Cerambycidae. It was described by Mitono in 1943.
