= Neacanista tuberculipenne =

Scientific classification
- Kingdom: Animalia
- Phylum: Arthropoda
- Class: Insecta
- Order: Coleoptera
- Suborder: Polyphaga
- Infraorder: Cucujiformia
- Family: Cerambycidae
- Genus: Neacanista
- Species: N. tuberculipenne

Binomial name
- Neacanista tuberculipenne Gressitt, 1940

Species of beetle

Neacanista tuberculipenne is a species of beetle in the family Cerambycidae. It was described by Gressitt in 1940.
