= Mimillaena =

Scientific classification
- Kingdom: Animalia
- Phylum: Arthropoda
- Class: Insecta
- Order: Coleoptera
- Suborder: Polyphaga
- Infraorder: Cucujiformia
- Family: Cerambycidae
- Tribe: Acanthocinini
- Genus: Mimillaena

Genus of beetles

Mimillaena is a genus of beetles in the family Cerambycidae, containing the following species:

- Mimillaena rufescens Breuning, 1958
- Mimillaena semiobscura Hayashi, 1961
