= Mimillaena semiobscura =

Scientific classification
- Kingdom: Animalia
- Phylum: Arthropoda
- Class: Insecta
- Order: Coleoptera
- Suborder: Polyphaga
- Infraorder: Cucujiformia
- Family: Cerambycidae
- Genus: Mimillaena
- Species: M. semiobscura

Binomial name
- Mimillaena semiobscura Hayashi, 1961

Species of beetle

Mimillaena semiobscura is a species of beetle in the family Cerambycidae. It was described by Hayashi in 1961.
