= Mahenes =

Scientific classification
- Kingdom: Animalia
- Phylum: Arthropoda
- Class: Insecta
- Order: Coleoptera
- Suborder: Polyphaga
- Infraorder: Cucujiformia
- Family: Cerambycidae
- Tribe: Acanthocinini
- Genus: Mahenes

Genus of beetles

Mahenes is a genus of beetles in the family Cerambycidae, containing the following species:

- Mahenes demelti Breuning, 1980
- Mahenes semifasciatus Aurivillius, 1922
