= Mahenes semifasciatus =

Scientific classification
- Kingdom: Animalia
- Phylum: Arthropoda
- Class: Insecta
- Order: Coleoptera
- Suborder: Polyphaga
- Infraorder: Cucujiformia
- Family: Cerambycidae
- Genus: Mahenes
- Species: M. semifasciatus

Binomial name
- Mahenes semifasciatus Aurivillius, 1922

Species of beetle

Mahenes semifasciatus is a species of beetle in the family Cerambycidae. It was described by Per Olof Christopher Aurivillius in 1922.
