= Mahenes demelti =

Scientific classification
- Kingdom: Animalia
- Phylum: Arthropoda
- Class: Insecta
- Order: Coleoptera
- Suborder: Polyphaga
- Infraorder: Cucujiformia
- Family: Cerambycidae
- Genus: Mahenes
- Species: M. demelti

Binomial name
- Mahenes demelti Breuning, 1980

Species of beetle

Mahenes demelti is a species of beetle in the family Cerambycidae. It was described by Breuning in 1980.
