= Tenthras setosus =

Scientific classification
- Kingdom: Animalia
- Phylum: Arthropoda
- Class: Insecta
- Order: Coleoptera
- Suborder: Polyphaga
- Infraorder: Cucujiformia
- Family: Cerambycidae
- Genus: Tenthras
- Species: T. setosus

Binomial name
- Tenthras setosus Monné & Tavakilian, 1990

Species of beetle

Tenthras setosus is a species of beetle in the family Cerambycidae. It was described by Monné and Tavakilian in 1990.
