= Tenthras =

Scientific classification
- Kingdom: Animalia
- Phylum: Arthropoda
- Class: Insecta
- Order: Coleoptera
- Suborder: Polyphaga
- Infraorder: Cucujiformia
- Family: Cerambycidae
- Tribe: Acanthocinini
- Genus: Tenthras

Genus of beetles

Tenthras is a genus of beetles in the family Cerambycidae, containing the following species:

- Tenthras obliteratus Thomson, 1864
- Tenthras setosus Monné & Tavakilian, 1990
