= Nesomomus fasciculosus =

Scientific classification
- Kingdom: Animalia
- Phylum: Arthropoda
- Class: Insecta
- Order: Coleoptera
- Suborder: Polyphaga
- Infraorder: Cucujiformia
- Family: Cerambycidae
- Genus: Nesomomus
- Species: N. fasciculosus

Binomial name
- Nesomomus fasciculosus Breuning, 1956

Species of beetle

Nesomomus fasciculosus is a species of beetle in the family Cerambycidae. It was described by Breuning in 1956.
