= Pucallpa cristata =

Scientific classification
- Kingdom: Animalia
- Phylum: Arthropoda
- Class: Insecta
- Order: Coleoptera
- Suborder: Polyphaga
- Infraorder: Cucujiformia
- Family: Cerambycidae
- Genus: Pucallpa
- Species: P. cristata

Binomial name
- Pucallpa cristata Lane, 1959

Species of beetle

Pucallpa cristata is a species of beetle in the family Cerambycidae. Lane described it in 1959.
