= Pucallpa (beetle) =

Scientific classification
- Kingdom: Animalia
- Phylum: Arthropoda
- Class: Insecta
- Order: Coleoptera
- Suborder: Polyphaga
- Infraorder: Cucujiformia
- Family: Cerambycidae
- Tribe: Acanthocinini
- Genus: Pucallpa

Genus of beetles

Pucallpa is a genus of beetles in the family Cerambycidae, containing the following species:

- Pucallpa cristata Lane, 1959
- Pucallpa robusta Monné, 1978
