= Pucallpa robusta =

Scientific classification
- Kingdom: Animalia
- Phylum: Arthropoda
- Class: Insecta
- Order: Coleoptera
- Suborder: Polyphaga
- Infraorder: Cucujiformia
- Family: Cerambycidae
- Genus: Pucallpa
- Species: P. robusta

Binomial name
- Pucallpa robusta Monné, 1978

Species of beetle

Pucallpa robusta is a species of beetle in the family Cerambycidae. It was described by Monné in 1978.
