= Lathroeus =

Scientific classification
- Kingdom: Animalia
- Phylum: Arthropoda
- Class: Insecta
- Order: Coleoptera
- Suborder: Polyphaga
- Infraorder: Cucujiformia
- Family: Cerambycidae
- Tribe: Acanthocinini
- Genus: Lathroeus

Genus of beetles

Lathroeus is a genus of beetles in the family Cerambycidae, containing the following species:

- Lathroeus mysticus Melzer, 1932
- Lathroeus oreoderoides Thomson, 1864
