= Lathroeus mysticus =

Scientific classification
- Kingdom: Animalia
- Phylum: Arthropoda
- Class: Insecta
- Order: Coleoptera
- Suborder: Polyphaga
- Infraorder: Cucujiformia
- Family: Cerambycidae
- Genus: Lathroeus
- Species: L. mysticus

Binomial name
- Lathroeus mysticus Melzer, 1932

Species of beetle

Lathroeus mysticus is a species of beetle in the family Cerambycidae.
