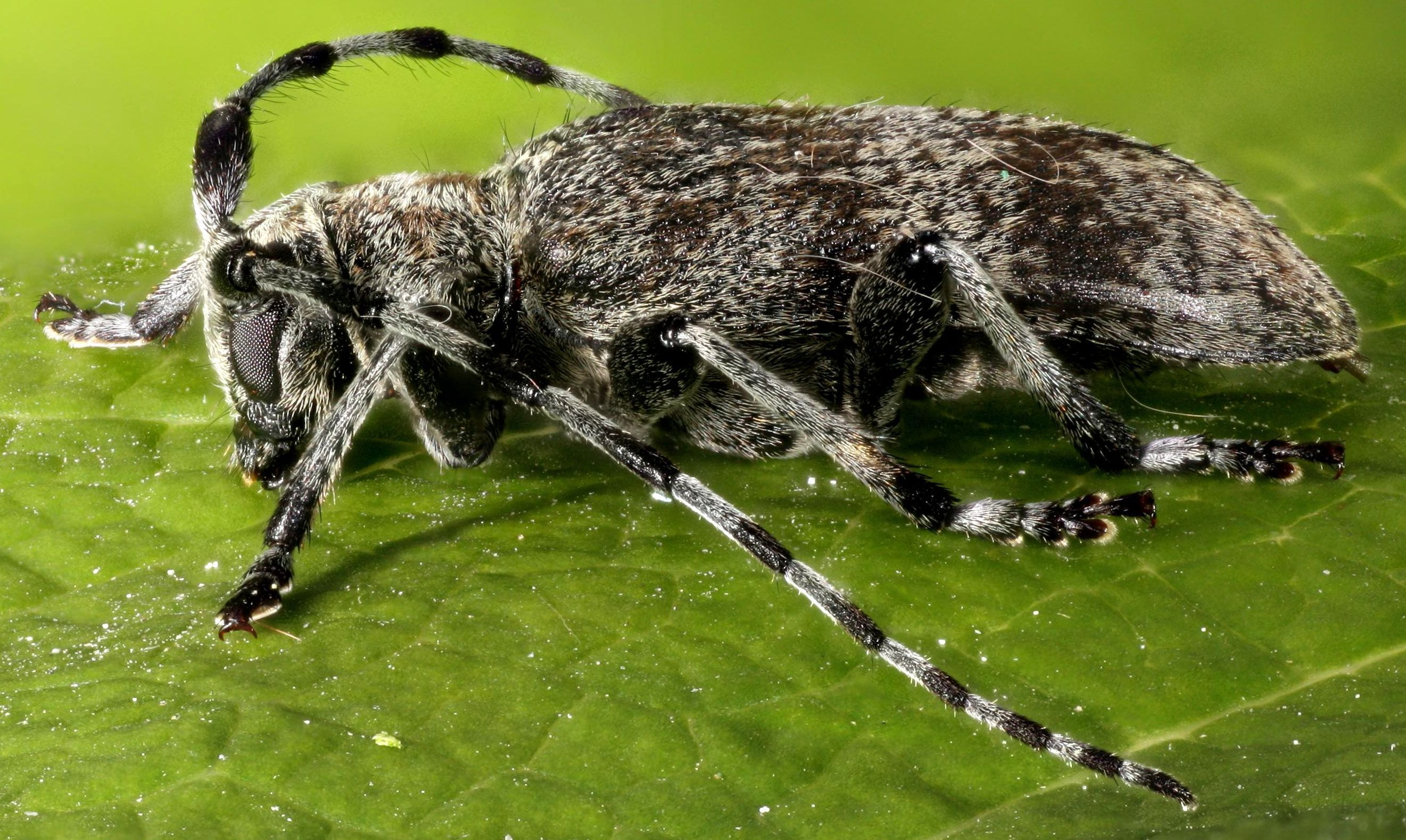
- Oplosia cinerea

Scientific classification
- Kingdom: Animalia
- Phylum: Arthropoda
- Clade: Pancrustacea
- Class: Insecta
- Order: Coleoptera
- Suborder: Polyphaga
- Infraorder: Cucujiformia
- Family: Cerambycidae
- Subfamily: Lamiinae
- Tribe: Desmiphorini; Thomson, 1860

Synonyms
- Ancitini; Apodasyides Lacordaire, 1872; Apodasyini Lacordaire, 1872; Ectatosiides Lacordaire, 1872; Epicastides Lacordaire, 1872; Essisini Aurivillius, 1917; Estolides Lacordaire, 1872; Estolini Lacordaire, 1872; Hoplosiae LeConte & Horn, 1883; Psenocerini LeConte, 1873

= Desmiphorini =

Tribe of beetles

Desmiphorini is a tribe of longhorn beetles of the subfamily Lamiinae.

== Taxonomy ==
Desmiphorini contains the following genera:

- Aconopteroides Breuning, 1959
- Aconopterus Blanchard in Gay, 1851
- Adjinga Pic, 1926
- Alice Ślipiński & Escalona, 2013
- Alloblabia Galileo, Santos-Silva & Bezark, 2017
- Allotigrinestola Heffern & Santos-Silva, 2017
- Amblymora Pascoe, 1867
- Amblymoropsis Breuning, 1958
- Amymoma Pascoe, 1866
- Anacasta Aurivillius, 1916
- Anaespogonius Gressitt, 1938
- Anaesthetis Dejean, 1835
- Anaesthetobrium Pic, 1923
- Anisopeplus Melzer, 1935
- Aphronastes Fairmaire, 1896
- Apodasya Pascoe, 1863
- Aragea Hayashi, 1953
- Arhopaloscelis Murzin, Danilevsky & Lobanov, 1981
- Asaperdina Breuning, 1975
- Atelodesmis Chevrolat, 1841
- Atimiliopsis Breuning, 1974
- Atimiola Bates, 1880
- Baraeomimus Breuning, 1973
- Belodasys Breuning, 1954
- Beloderoides Breuning, 1940
- Blabia Thomson, 1864
- Blabicentrus Bates, 1866
- Bonipogonius Kusama, 1974
- Bucynthia Pascoe, 1866
- Bulborhodopis Breuning, 1948
- Caledoamblymora Sudre & Mille, 2013
- Callapoecus Bates, 1884
- Capillicornis Galileo & Martins, 2012
- Catognatha Blanchard in Gay, 1851
- Ceiupaba Martins & Galileo, 1998
- Cervoglenea Gressitt, 1951
- Chaetacanthidius Gilmour, 1948
- Cicatrisestola Breuning, 1947
- Cicatrisestoloides Breuning & Heyrovsky, 1964
- Cicuiara Galileo & Martins, 1996
- Cleidaria Nascimento & Santos-Silva, 2020
- Clermontia Pic, 1927
- Clytosemia Bates, 1884
- Coeloprocta Aurivillius, 1926
- Cotyschnolea Martins & Galileo, 2007
- Crinotarsus Blanchard, 1853
- Cristatosybra Breuning, 1959
- Cristorhodopina Breuning, 1966
- Curuapira Martins & Galileo, 1998
- Cylindilla Bates, 1884
- Cymatonycha Bates, 1874
- Cyocyphax Thomson, 1878
- Deroplia Dejean, 1835
- Desmiphora Audinet-Serville, 1835
- Diadelia Waterhouse, 1882
- Diadelioides Breuning, 1940
- Didymocentrotus McKeown, 1945
- Diliolophus Bates, 1885
- Disgregus Galileo & Martins, 2009
- Dolichestola Breuning, 1942
- Dorcaschesis Heller, 1924
- Dysthaeta Pascoe, 1859
- Ectatina Gahan, 1907
- Ectatosia Pascoe, 1857
- Epicasta Thomson, 1864
- Esaguasu Galileo & Martins, 2007
- Essisus Pascoe, 1866
- Estola Fairmaire & Germain, 1859
- Estoloides Breuning, 1940
- Estolomimus Breuning, 1940
- Etyma Galileo & Martins, 2012
- Euestola Breuning, 1943
- Eugrapheus Fairmaire, 1896
- Eupogoniopsis Breuning, 1949
- Eupogonius LeConte, 1852
- Euseboides Gahan, 1893
- Excastra Tweed, Ashman & Ślipiński, 2024
- Fallaxdesmis Santos-Silva & Wappes, 2018
- Falsadjinga Breuning, 1959
- Falsamblymora Breuning, 1959
- Falsapomecyna Breuning, 1942
- Falsatimura Pic, 1926
- Falsohyagnis Breuning, 1940
- Falsorsidis Breuning, 1959
- Falsoserixia Pic, 1926
- Falsostesilea Breuning, 1940
- Falsoterinaea Matsushita, 1938
- Falsovelleda Breuning, 1954
- Falsozeargyra Gilmour & Breuning, 1963
- Gibbestola Breuning, 1940
- Gibbestoloides Breuning, 1940
- Graphidessa Bates, 1884
- Gyrpanetes Martins & Galileo, 1998
- Hallothamus Thomson, 1868
- Heteresmia Monné, 2005
- Hoplorana Fairmaire, 1896
- Ibypeba Martins & Galileo, 2012
- Icublabia Galileo & Martins, 2003
- Illaena Erichson, 1842
- Inermaegocidnus Breuning, 1961
- Inermestola Breuning, 1942
- Inermestoloides Breuning, 1966
- Iphiothe Pascoe, 1866
- Ipochiromima Sama & Sudre, 2009
- Ischnolea Thomson, 1861
- Ischnoleomimus Breuning, 1940
- Iurubanga Martins & Galileo, 1996
- Jolyellus Galileo & Martins, 2007
- Kerodiadelia Sudre & Teocchi, 2002
- Lamiessa Bates, 1885
- Languriomiccolamia Matsuo & Yamasako, 2011
- Laoterinaea Breuning, 1965
- Malthonea Thomson, 1864
- Maublancancylistes Lepesme & Breuning, 1956
- Mesotroea Breuning, 1939
- Metallographeus Breuning, 1971
- Metasulenus Breuning, 1971
- Meton Pascoe, 1862
- Miccolamia Bates, 1884
- Micratelodesmis Martins & Galileo, 2012
- Microestola Gressitt, 1940
- Microrhodopina Breuning, 1982
- Microrhodopis Breuning, 1957
- Mimacalolepta Breuning, 1976
- Mimacartus Sudre & Delatour, 2019
- Mimadjinga Breuning, 1940
- Mimalblymoroides Breuning, 1969
- Mimancylistes Breuning, 1955
- Mimapatelarthron Breuning, 1940
- Mimasyngenes Breuning, 1950
- Mimauxa Breuning, 1980
- Mimectatina Aurivillius, 1927
- Mimeremon Breuning, 1967
- Mimestola Breuning, 1940
- Mimeuseboides Breuning, 1967
- Mimillaena Breuning, 1958
- Mimipochira Breuning, 1956
- Mimocentrura Breuning, 1940
- Mimodiadelia Breuning, 1971
- Mimodystasia Breuning, 1956
- Mimogmodera Breuning, 1955
- Mimogyaritus Fisher, 1925
- Mimohomonoea Breuning, 1961
- Mimolophia Breuning, 1940
- Mimomorpha Newman, 1842
- Mimomulciber Breuning, 1942
- Mimopogonius Breuning, 1974
- Mimoscapeuseboides Breuning, 1976
- Mimosciadella Breuning, 1958
- Mimoserixia Breuning, 1963
- Mimostedes Breuning, 1955
- Mimostenellipsis Breuning, 1956
- Mimothelais Breuning, 1958
- Mimotroea Breuning, 1939
- Mimovitalisia Breuning, 1959
- Mimozotale Breuning, 1951
- Monnetyra Galileo & Martins, 2006
- Murupi Martins & Galileo, 1998
- Mynonebra Pascoe, 1864
- Myonebrides Breuning, 1957
- Nedine Thomson, 1864
- Neissa Pascoe, 1866
- Neocolobura Monné, 2005
- Neodiadelia Breuning, 1956
- Neoepaphra Fisher, 1935
- Nepagyrtes Martins & Galileo, 1998
- Nicarete Thomson, 1864
- Nonyma Pascoe, 1864
- Nyoma Duvivier, 1892
- Obscenoides Nascimento & Santos-Silva, 2020
- Ocularoleiopus Sudre, Jiroux & Vitali, 2018
- Oiceaca Martins & Galileo, 1998
- Oricopis Pascoe, 1863
- Othelais Pascoe, 1866
- Otroea Pascoe, 1866
- Otroeopsis Breuning, 1939
- Panegyrtes Thomson, 1868
- Parablabicentrus Dalens, Touroult & Tavakilian, 2009
- Paradesmiphora Breuning, 1959
- Paradjinga Breuning, 1970
- Paramblymora Breuning, 1961
- Paranaesthetis Breuning, 1982
- Paraphronastes Breuning, 1980
- Pararhopaloscelides Breuning, 1947
- Parasalvazaon Breuning, 1958
- Parasophronica Breuning, 1940
- Parasophroniella Breuning, 1943
- Parasulenus Breuning, 1957
- Paratimiola Breuning, 1965
- Parectatina Breuning, 1959
- Parectatosia Breuning, 1940
- Paressisus Aurivillius, 1917
- Parestola Bates, 1880
- Pareuseboides Breuning, 1948
- Parischnolea Breuning, 1942
- Paroectropsis Cerda, 1954
- Paroricopis Breuning, 1958
- Parothelais Breuning, 1948
- Pentacosmia Newman, 1842
- Penthides Matsushita, 1933
- Philicus Pascoe, 1883
- Phlyarus Pascoe, 1858
- Phyxium Pascoe, 1864
- Piimuna Martins & Galileo, 1998
- Pilomecyna Breuning, 1940
- Piruauna Galileo & Martins, 1998
- Pithomictus Pascoe, 1864
- Pogonillus Bates, 1885
- Probatodes Thomson, 1864
- Proparasophronica Sama & Sudre, 2009
- Protumida Monné & Wappes, 2014
- Psenocerus LeConte, 1852
- Pseudanaesthetis Pic, 1922
- Pseudectatosia Breuning, 1940
- Pseudepaphra Breuning, 1956
- Pseudestola Breuning, 1940
- Pseudestoloides Breuning & Heyrovsky, 1961
- Pseudeuseboides Breuning, 1968
- Pseudischnolea Breuning, 1953
- Pseudocentruropsis Breuning, 1961
- Pseudonicarete Breuning, 1980
- Pseudorhodopis Breuning, 1940
- Pseudoricopis Breuning, 1970
- Pseudoropica Breuning, 1968
- Pseudosophronica Breuning, 1978
- Pseudostyne Breuning, 1940
- Pseudosybrinus Adlbauer, 2021
- Pseudoterinaea Breuning, 1940
- Ptericoptomimus Melzer, 1935
- †Pterolophosoma Vitali, 2006
- Pterolophioides Breuning, 1942
- Pygmaeopsis Schaeffer, 1908
- Quasimesosella Miroshnikov, 2006
- Retilla Lacordaire, 1872
- Rhodopina Gressitt, 1951
- Rhopaloscelis Blessig, 1873
- Rileyellus Wappes & Santos-Silva, 2020
- Rosalbopsis Galileo & Santos-Silva, 2017
- Rufosophronica Breuning, 1971
- Rufulosophronica Breuning, 1960
- Salvazaon Pic, 1928
- Scapeuseboides Breuning, 1958
- Scaposerixia Breuning, 1975
- Serixiomimus Breuning, 1966
- Similonedine Hua, 1993
- Sophronica Blanchard, 1845
- Sophronicoides Breuning, 1986
- Sophronisca Aurivillius, 1910
- Sormida Gahan, 1888
- Sormidomorpha Aurivillius, 1920
- Soupha Breuning, 1963
- Sphigmothorax Gressitt, 1939
- Spinestoloides Breuning, 1954
- Spineugrapheus Breuning, 1964
- Spinosophronica Breuning, 1948
- Spinosophroniella Breuning, 1961
- Spinosophronisca Breuning, 1962
- Spinozorilispe Breuning, 1963
- Stenideogmodera Sudre & Delatour, 2019
- Stenocentrura Breuning, 1948
- Stereomerus Melzer, 1935
- Striatanaesthetis Breuning, 1957
- Sulenopsis Breuning, 1957
- Sybrinus Gahan, 1900
- Sybrocentrura Breuning, 1947
- Sybrodoius Breuning, 1957
- Sydonia Thomson, 1864
- Taelosilla Thomson, 1868
- Taiwanajinga Hayashi, 1978
- Temnolamia Breuning, 1961
- Terinaea Bates, 1884
- Tesapeus Galileo & Martins, 2012
- Tetroreopsis Breuning, 1940
- Thereselia Pic, 1944
- Tigrinestola Breuning, 1949
- Trichadjinga Breuning, 1975
- Trichestola Breuning, 1950
- Trichoserixia Breuning, 1965
- Trichosophroniella Breuning, 1959
- Trichostenidea Breuning, 1948
- Trichostenideus Teocchi & Sudre, 2009
- Trichotroea Breuning, 1956
- Unelcus Thomson, 1864
- Ussurella Danilevsky, 1997
- Velora Thomson, 1864
- Veloroides Breuning, 1956
- Veloropsis Breuning, 1969
- Vittatopothyne Breuning, 1968
- Wappesellus Martins, Santos-Silva & Galileo, 2015
- Zorilispiella Breuning, 1959
- Zotalemimon Pic, 1925
