= Rhodopinini =

Scientific classification
- Domain: Eukaryota
- Kingdom: Animalia
- Phylum: Arthropoda
- Class: Insecta
- Order: Coleoptera
- Suborder: Polyphaga
- Infraorder: Cucujiformia
- Family: Cerambycidae
- Subfamily: Lamiinae
- Tribe: Rhodopinini; Gressitt, 1951

Tribe of beetles

Rhodopinini is a tribe of longhorn beetles of the subfamily Lamiinae. It was described by Gressitt in 1951.

== Taxonomy ==
- Cristorhodopina Breuning, 1966
- Microrhodopis Breuning, 1957
- Pseudorhodopis Breuning, 1940
- Rhodopina Gressitt, 1951
