= Bucynthia marmorata =

Scientific classification
- Domain: Eukaryota
- Kingdom: Animalia
- Phylum: Arthropoda
- Class: Insecta
- Order: Coleoptera
- Suborder: Polyphaga
- Infraorder: Cucujiformia
- Family: Cerambycidae
- Genus: Bucynthia
- Species: B. marmorata

Binomial name
- Bucynthia marmorata (Breuning, 1963)

Synonyms
- Mimozygocera marmorata Breuning, 1963

Species of beetles

Bucynthia marmorata is a species of beetle in the family Cerambycidae. It was described by Stephan von Breuning in 1963. It is known from Australia.
