= Mimasyngenes venezuelensis =

Scientific classification
- Kingdom: Animalia
- Phylum: Arthropoda
- Class: Insecta
- Order: Coleoptera
- Suborder: Polyphaga
- Infraorder: Cucujiformia
- Family: Cerambycidae
- Genus: Mimasyngenes
- Species: M. venezuelensis

Binomial name
- Mimasyngenes venezuelensis Breuning, 1956

Species of beetle

Mimasyngenes venezuelensis is a species of beetle in the family Cerambycidae. It was described by Stephan von Breuning in 1956. It is known from Venezuela (from which its species epithet).
