= Mimalblymoroides heinrichi =

Scientific classification
- Kingdom: Animalia
- Phylum: Arthropoda
- Class: Insecta
- Order: Coleoptera
- Suborder: Polyphaga
- Infraorder: Cucujiformia
- Family: Cerambycidae
- Genus: Mimalblymoroides
- Species: M. heinrichi

Binomial name
- Mimalblymoroides heinrichi Breuning, 1973

Species of beetle

Mimalblymoroides heinrichi is a species of beetle in the family Cerambycidae. It was described by Stephan von Breuning in 1973. It is known from Papua New Guinea.
