= Nicarete albostictipennis =

Scientific classification
- Kingdom: Animalia
- Phylum: Arthropoda
- Class: Insecta
- Order: Coleoptera
- Suborder: Polyphaga
- Infraorder: Cucujiformia
- Family: Cerambycidae
- Genus: Nicarete
- Species: N. albostictipennis

Binomial name
- Nicarete albostictipennis Breuning, 1957

Species of beetle

Nicarete albostictipennis is a species of beetle in the family Cerambycidae. It was described by Stephan von Breuning in 1957.
