= Nicarete melanura =

Scientific classification
- Domain: Eukaryota
- Kingdom: Animalia
- Phylum: Arthropoda
- Class: Insecta
- Order: Coleoptera
- Suborder: Polyphaga
- Infraorder: Cucujiformia
- Family: Cerambycidae
- Genus: Nicarete
- Species: N. melanura

Binomial name
- Nicarete melanura Pascoe, 1886

Species of beetle

Nicarete melanura is a species of beetle in the family Cerambycidae. It was described by Pascoe in 1886.
