= Languriomiccolamia =

Scientific classification
- Kingdom: Animalia
- Phylum: Arthropoda
- Clade: Pancrustacea
- Class: Insecta
- Order: Coleoptera
- Suborder: Polyphaga
- Infraorder: Cucujiformia
- Family: Cerambycidae
- Tribe: Desmiphorini
- Genus: Languriomiccolamia; Matsuo & Yamasako, 2011

Synonyms
- Languriomorpha Fisher, 1925 (non Gorham, 1887: preoccupied)

Genus of beetles

Languriomiccolamia bicolor is a species of beetle in the family Cerambycidae, and the only species in the genus Languriomiccolamia. It was established by Matsuo & Yamasako in 2011, because the former genus name of this singula beetle, Languriomorpha, had already been given to a pleasing fungus beetle genus earlier.
