= Mimacalolepta =

Scientific classification
- Kingdom: Animalia
- Phylum: Arthropoda
- Class: Insecta
- Order: Coleoptera
- Suborder: Polyphaga
- Infraorder: Cucujiformia
- Family: Cerambycidae
- Tribe: Desmiphorini
- Genus: Mimacalolepta; Breuning, 1976
- Species: M. dunni

Binomial name
- Mimacalolepta dunni Breuning, 1976

Genus of beetles

Mimacalolepta is a genus of longhorned beetles in the family Cerambycidae. This genus has a single species, Mimacalolepta dunni, found in Papua New Guinea.
