= Heteresmia spissicornis =

Scientific classification
- Kingdom: Animalia
- Phylum: Arthropoda
- Class: Insecta
- Order: Coleoptera
- Suborder: Polyphaga
- Infraorder: Cucujiformia
- Family: Cerambycidae
- Genus: Heteresmia
- Species: H. spissicornis

Binomial name
- Heteresmia spissicornis (Fabricius, 1801)

Synonyms
- Esmia spissicornis Martins & Galileo, 1992; Hemilophus spissicornis Aurivillius, 1923; Saperda spissicornis Fabricius, 1801

Species of beetle

Heteresmia spissicornis is a species of beetle in the family Cerambycidae. It was described by Johan Christian Fabricius in 1801. It is known from Brazil.
