= Nicarete (beetle) =

Scientific classification
- Domain: Eukaryota
- Kingdom: Animalia
- Phylum: Arthropoda
- Class: Insecta
- Order: Coleoptera
- Suborder: Polyphaga
- Infraorder: Cucujiformia
- Family: Cerambycidae
- Tribe: Desmiphorini
- Genus: Nicarete

Genus of beetles

Nicarete is a genus of longhorn beetles of the subfamily Lamiinae.

== Species ==
The genus contains the following subgenera and species:

Subgenus Aspurgus

- Nicarete cineraria Fairmaire, 1900

Subgenus Crossotiades

- Nicarete pallidula Fairmaire, 1902
- Nicarete perrieri Fairmaire, 1898

Subgenus Nicarete

- Nicarete albovittipennis Breuning, 1957
- Nicarete brunnipennis Thomson, 1864
- Nicarete holorufa Breuning, 1970
- Nicarete similis Breuning, 1965

Subgenus Ouphalacra

- Nicarete affinis Breuning, 1940
- Nicarete albostictipennis Breuning, 1957
- Nicarete coquereli Fairmaire, 1896
- Nicarete impressipennis Fairmaire, 1897
- Nicarete submaculosa Fairmaire, 1904

Subgenus Tanylamia

- Nicarete albolineata Fairmaire, 1904
- Nicarete melanura Pascoe, 1886
- Nicarete villosicornis (Fairmaire, 1896)
