= Heteresmia seabrai =

Scientific classification
- Kingdom: Animalia
- Phylum: Arthropoda
- Class: Insecta
- Order: Coleoptera
- Suborder: Polyphaga
- Infraorder: Cucujiformia
- Family: Cerambycidae
- Genus: Heteresmia
- Species: H. seabrai

Binomial name
- Heteresmia seabrai (Lane & Prosen, 1961)

Synonyms
- Esmia seabrai Lanne & Prosen, 1961

Species of beetle

Heteresmia seabrai is a species of beetle in the family Cerambycidae. It was described by Lane and Prosen in 1961. It is known from Brazil and Peru.
