= Phaeapate albula =

Scientific classification
- Kingdom: Animalia
- Phylum: Arthropoda
- Class: Insecta
- Order: Coleoptera
- Suborder: Polyphaga
- Infraorder: Cucujiformia
- Family: Cerambycidae
- Genus: Phaeapate
- Species: P. albula

Binomial name
- Phaeapate albula Pascoe, 1865

Species of beetle

Phaeapate albula is a species of beetle in the family Cerambycidae. It was described by Pascoe in 1865. It is found in Australia.
