= Mimasyngenes lepidotus =

Scientific classification
- Domain: Eukaryota
- Kingdom: Animalia
- Phylum: Arthropoda
- Class: Insecta
- Order: Coleoptera
- Suborder: Polyphaga
- Infraorder: Cucujiformia
- Family: Cerambycidae
- Genus: Mimasyngenes
- Species: M. lepidotus

Binomial name
- Mimasyngenes lepidotus Clarke, 2007

Species of beetle

Mimasyngenes lepidotus is a species of beetle in the family Cerambycidae. It was described by Clarke in 2007. It is known from Bolivia.
