= Nicarete pallidula =

Scientific classification
- Kingdom: Animalia
- Phylum: Arthropoda
- Class: Insecta
- Order: Coleoptera
- Suborder: Polyphaga
- Infraorder: Cucujiformia
- Family: Cerambycidae
- Genus: Nicarete
- Species: N. pallidula

Binomial name
- Nicarete pallidula Fairmaire, 1902

Species of beetle

Nicarete pallidula is a species of beetle in the family Cerambycidae. It was described by Fairmaire in 1902.
