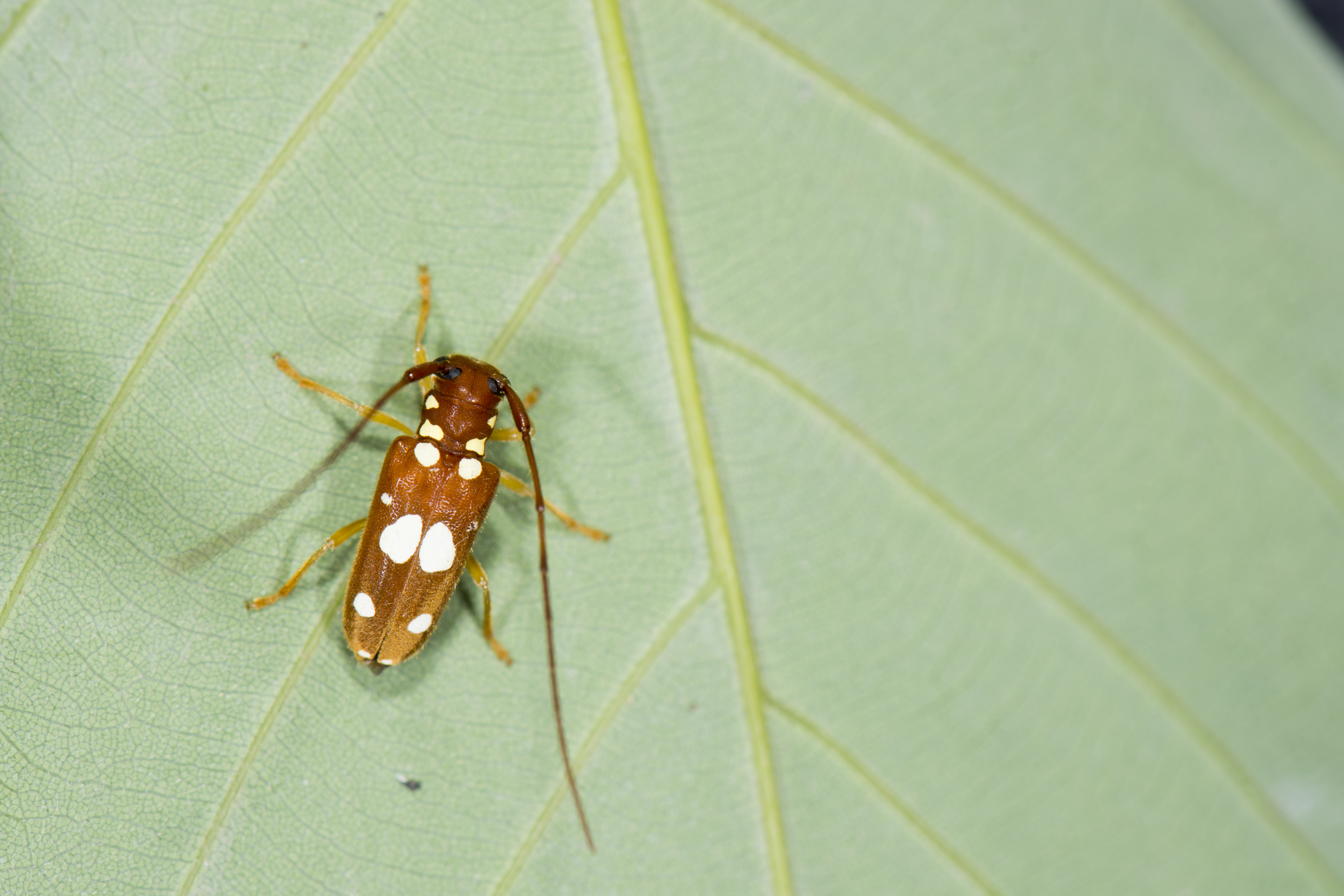

Scientific classification
- Kingdom: Animalia
- Phylum: Arthropoda
- Class: Insecta
- Order: Coleoptera
- Suborder: Polyphaga
- Infraorder: Cucujiformia
- Family: Cerambycidae
- Subfamily: Lamiinae
- Tribe: Desmiphorini
- Genus: Cervoglenea; Gressitt, 1951
- Species: C. lata

Binomial name
- Cervoglenea lata (Gressitt, 1935)

Synonyms
- Glenea lata Gressitt, 1935

= Cervoglenea =

Genus of beetles

Cervoglenea lata is a species of beetle in the family Cerambycidae, and the only species in the genus Cervoglenea. It was described as Glenea lata by J.L. Gressitt in 1935, from a specimen taken in Taiwan. He later placed it in a separate genus Cervoglenea.
