= Sydonia =

Scientific classification
- Domain: Eukaryota
- Kingdom: Animalia
- Phylum: Arthropoda
- Class: Insecta
- Order: Coleoptera
- Suborder: Polyphaga
- Infraorder: Cucujiformia
- Family: Cerambycidae
- Subfamily: Lamiinae
- Tribe: Desmiphorini
- Genus: Sydonia; Thomson, 1864
- Species: S. apomecynoides

Binomial name
- Sydonia apomecynoides Thomson, 1864

Genus of beetles

Sydonia is a genus of long-horned beetles in the family Cerambycidae. This genus has a single species, Sydonia apomecynoides, found in Malaysia and Singapore.
