= Amymoma =

Scientific classification
- Domain: Eukaryota
- Kingdom: Animalia
- Phylum: Arthropoda
- Class: Insecta
- Order: Coleoptera
- Suborder: Polyphaga
- Infraorder: Cucujiformia
- Family: Cerambycidae
- Tribe: Desmiphorini
- Genus: Amymoma
- Species: A. pulchella

Binomial name
- Amymoma pulchella Pascoe, 1866

Genus of beetles

Amymoma is a genus of beetles in the family Cerambycidae, containing a single species, Amymoma pulchella. It was described by Francis Polkinghorne Pascoe in 1866.
