= Heteresmia =

Scientific classification
- Kingdom: Animalia
- Phylum: Arthropoda
- Class: Insecta
- Order: Coleoptera
- Suborder: Polyphaga
- Infraorder: Cucujiformia
- Family: Cerambycidae
- Tribe: Desmiphorini
- Genus: Heteresmia

Genus of beetles

Heteresmia is a genus of longhorn beetles of the subfamily Lamiinae, containing the following species:

- Heteresmia seabrai (Lane & Prosen, 1961)
- Heteresmia spissicornis (Fabricius, 1801)
- Heteresmia turbata (Pascoe, 1859)
