= Myonebrides =

Scientific classification
- Kingdom: Animalia
- Phylum: Arthropoda
- Class: Insecta
- Order: Coleoptera
- Suborder: Polyphaga
- Infraorder: Cucujiformia
- Family: Cerambycidae
- Tribe: Desmiphorini
- Genus: Myonebrides

Genus of beetles

Myonebrides is a genus of longhorn beetles of the subfamily Lamiinae, containing the following species:

- Myonebrides crassepunctata Breuning, 1957
- Myonebrides flavomaculata Breuning, 1969
- Myonebrides sexpunctata Breuning, 1957
