= Mimasyngenes lineatipennis =

Scientific classification
- Kingdom: Animalia
- Phylum: Arthropoda
- Clade: Pancrustacea
- Class: Insecta
- Order: Coleoptera
- Suborder: Polyphaga
- Infraorder: Cucujiformia
- Family: Cerambycidae
- Genus: Mimasyngenes
- Species: M. lineatipennis

Binomial name
- Mimasyngenes lineatipennis Breuning, 1950

Species of beetle

Mimasyngenes lineatipennis is a species of beetle in the family Cerambycidae. It was described by Stephan von Breuning in 1950. It is found in Brazil (Goiás, Mato Grosso do Sul, Maranhão, Pernambuco, Bahia, São Paulo, Paraná), Bolivia (Santa Cruz), Argentina (Santiago del Estero) and Paraguay (Amambay, Itapúa, Guairá, Paraguari).

== Physical Description ==
Specimens are chestnut-colored with a coppery sheen on the head and pronotum; antennae and hind portions of the underside tend to be darker. Elytra, legs, and underside are comparatively paler.[2]
