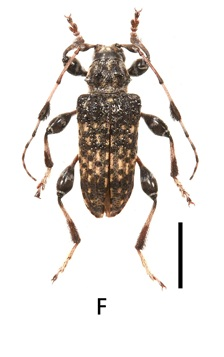
- Clermontia quadridentata

Scientific classification
- Kingdom: Animalia
- Phylum: Arthropoda
- Class: Insecta
- Order: Coleoptera
- Suborder: Polyphaga
- Infraorder: Cucujiformia
- Family: Cerambycidae
- Subfamily: Lamiinae
- Tribe: Desmiphorini
- Genus: Clermontia; Pic, 1927

= Clermontia (beetle) =

Genus of beetles

Clermontia is a genus of longhorn beetles of the subfamily Lamiinae.

- Clermontia quadridentata Pic, 1927
