= Nicarete similis =

Scientific classification
- Kingdom: Animalia
- Phylum: Arthropoda
- Class: Insecta
- Order: Coleoptera
- Suborder: Polyphaga
- Infraorder: Cucujiformia
- Family: Cerambycidae
- Genus: Nicarete
- Species: N. similis

Binomial name
- Nicarete similis Breuning, 1965

Species of beetle

Nicarete similis is a species of beetle in the family Cerambycidae. It was described by Stephan von Breuning in 1965.
