= Murupi =

Scientific classification
- Domain: Eukaryota
- Kingdom: Animalia
- Phylum: Arthropoda
- Class: Insecta
- Order: Coleoptera
- Suborder: Polyphaga
- Infraorder: Cucujiformia
- Family: Cerambycidae
- Tribe: Desmiphorini
- Genus: Murupi; Martins & Galileo, 1998
- Species: M. linearis

Binomial name
- Murupi linearis Martins & Galileo, 1998

Genus of beetles

Murupi is a genus of longhorned beetles in the family Cerambycidae. This genus has a single species, Murupi linearis, found in Brazil and French Guiana.
