= Phaeapate denticollis =

Scientific classification
- Kingdom: Animalia
- Phylum: Arthropoda
- Class: Insecta
- Order: Coleoptera
- Suborder: Polyphaga
- Infraorder: Cucujiformia
- Family: Cerambycidae
- Genus: Phaeapate
- Species: P. denticollis

Binomial name
- Phaeapate denticollis Pascoe, 1867

Synonyms
- Mimotemnosternus denticollis (Pascoe, 1867)

Species of beetle

Phaeapate denticollis is a species of beetle in the family Cerambycidae. It was described by Pascoe in 1867. It is known from Australia.
