= Mimopogonius =

Scientific classification
- Kingdom: Animalia
- Phylum: Arthropoda
- Class: Insecta
- Order: Coleoptera
- Suborder: Polyphaga
- Infraorder: Cucujiformia
- Family: Cerambycidae
- Tribe: Desmiphorini
- Genus: Mimopogonius

Genus of beetles

Mimopogonius is a genus of longhorn beetles of the subfamily Lamiinae, containing the following species:

- Mimopogonius hirsutus Breuning, 1974
- Mimopogonius hovorei Martins & Galileo, 2009
