= Nicarete coquereli =

Scientific classification
- Kingdom: Animalia
- Phylum: Arthropoda
- Class: Insecta
- Order: Coleoptera
- Suborder: Polyphaga
- Infraorder: Cucujiformia
- Family: Cerambycidae
- Genus: Nicarete
- Species: N. coquereli

Binomial name
- Nicarete coquereli Fairmaire, 1896

Species of beetle

Nicarete coquereli is a species of beetle in the family Cerambycidae. It was described by Fairmaire in 1896.
