= Bucynthia =

Scientific classification
- Kingdom: Animalia
- Phylum: Arthropoda
- Clade: Pancrustacea
- Class: Insecta
- Order: Coleoptera
- Suborder: Polyphaga
- Infraorder: Cucujiformia
- Family: Cerambycidae
- Tribe: Rhodopinini
- Genus: Bucynthia; Pascoe, 1868

Synonyms
- Mimozygocera Breuning, 1963; Spinostenellipsis Breuning, 1959

Genus of beetles

Bucynthia is a genus of longhorn beetles of the subfamily Lamiinae, containing the following species:

- Bucynthia borchmanni (Breuning, 1959)
- Bucynthia marmorata (Breuning, 1963)
- Bucynthia spiloptera (Pascoe, 1863)

Possibly also:

- Bucynthia ochrescens Breuning, 1980
