= Mimasyngenes quiuira =

Scientific classification
- Domain: Eukaryota
- Kingdom: Animalia
- Phylum: Arthropoda
- Class: Insecta
- Order: Coleoptera
- Suborder: Polyphaga
- Infraorder: Cucujiformia
- Family: Cerambycidae
- Genus: Mimasyngenes
- Species: M. quiuira

Binomial name
- Mimasyngenes quiuira Galileo & Martins, 1996

Species of beetle

Mimasyngenes quiuira is a species of beetle in the family Cerambycidae. It was described by Galileo and Martins in 1996. It is known from Brazil.
