= Mimasyngenes =

Scientific classification
- Domain: Eukaryota
- Kingdom: Animalia
- Phylum: Arthropoda
- Class: Insecta
- Order: Coleoptera
- Suborder: Polyphaga
- Infraorder: Cucujiformia
- Family: Cerambycidae
- Tribe: Desmiphorini
- Genus: Mimasyngenes

Genus of beetles

Mimasyngenes is a genus of longhorn beetles of the subfamily Lamiinae, containing the following species:

- Mimasyngenes icuapara Galileo & Martins, 1996
- Mimasyngenes inlineatus Breuning, 1956
- Mimasyngenes lepidotus Clarke, 2007
- Mimasyngenes lineatipennis Breuning, 1950
- Mimasyngenes lucianae Galileo & Martins, 2003
- Mimasyngenes multisetosus Clarke, 2007
- Mimasyngenes murutinga Martins & Galileo, 2006
- Mimasyngenes quiuira Galileo & Martins, 1996
- Mimasyngenes venezuelensis Breuning, 1956
- Mimasyngenes ytu Galileo & Martins, 1996
