= Mimotroea =

Scientific classification
- Kingdom: Animalia
- Phylum: Arthropoda
- Class: Insecta
- Order: Coleoptera
- Suborder: Polyphaga
- Infraorder: Cucujiformia
- Family: Cerambycidae
- Tribe: Desmiphorini
- Genus: Mimotroea; Breuning, 1939
- Species: M. cacioides

Binomial name
- Mimotroea cacioides Breuning, 1939

Genus of beetles

Mimotroea cacioides is a species of longhorn beetle in the subfamily Lamiinae, and the only species in the genus Mimotroea. It was described by Breuning in 1939. It is endemic to New Guinea.

It's 7.5 mm long and 2.25 mm wide, and its type locality is Kokoda, Papua New Guinea
