= Mesotroea =

Scientific classification
- Kingdom: Animalia
- Phylum: Arthropoda
- Class: Insecta
- Order: Coleoptera
- Suborder: Polyphaga
- Infraorder: Cucujiformia
- Family: Cerambycidae
- Tribe: Desmiphorini
- Genus: Mesotroea; Breuning, 1939
- Species: M. cyanipennis

Binomial name
- Mesotroea cyanipennis Breuning, 1939

Genus of beetles

Mesotroea cyanipennis is a species of beetle in the family Cerambycidae, and the only species in the genus Mesotroea. It was described by Breuning in 1939.

It's 9–9.5 mm long and 3 mm wide, and its type locality is Aneityum, Vanuatu.
