= Pseudoropica =

Scientific classification
- Kingdom: Animalia
- Phylum: Arthropoda
- Class: Insecta
- Order: Coleoptera
- Suborder: Polyphaga
- Infraorder: Cucujiformia
- Family: Cerambycidae
- Tribe: Desmiphorini
- Genus: Pseudoropica; Breuning, 1969
- Species: P. punctatostriata

Binomial name
- Pseudoropica punctatostriata Breuning, 1968

Genus of beetles

Pseudoropica is a genus of longhorned beetles in the family Cerambycidae. This genus has a single species, Pseudoropica punctatostriata, found in Madagascar.
