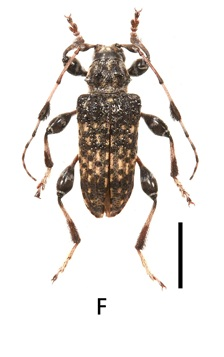

Scientific classification
- Kingdom: Animalia
- Phylum: Arthropoda
- Class: Insecta
- Order: Coleoptera
- Suborder: Polyphaga
- Infraorder: Cucujiformia
- Family: Cerambycidae
- Genus: Clermontia
- Species: C. quadridentata

Binomial name
- Clermontia quadridentata Pic, 1927

= Clermontia quadridentata =

Species of beetle

Clermontia quadridentata is a species of beetle of the Cerambycidae family. This species is found in Vietnam and China (Yunnan).
