= Bucynthia ochrescens =

Scientific classification
- Kingdom: Animalia
- Phylum: Arthropoda
- Class: Insecta
- Order: Coleoptera
- Suborder: Polyphaga
- Infraorder: Cucujiformia
- Family: Cerambycidae
- Genus: Bucynthia
- Species: B. ochrescens

Binomial name
- Bucynthia ochrescens Breuning, 1980

Species of beetle

Bucynthia ochrescens is a species of beetle in the family Cerambycidae. It was described by Breuning in 1980. It is known from Papua New Guinea.
