= Nicarete albovittipennis =

Scientific classification
- Kingdom: Animalia
- Phylum: Arthropoda
- Class: Insecta
- Order: Coleoptera
- Suborder: Polyphaga
- Infraorder: Cucujiformia
- Family: Cerambycidae
- Genus: Nicarete
- Species: N. albovittipennis

Binomial name
- Nicarete albovittipennis Breuning, 1957

Species of beetle

Nicarete albovittipennis is a species of beetle in the family Cerambycidae. It was described by Stephan von Breuning in 1957.

== Subspecies ==
- Nicarete albovittipennis albovittipennis Breuning, 1957
- Nicarete albovittipennis nigrotibialis Breuning, 1957
