= Ussurella =

Scientific classification
- Kingdom: Animalia
- Phylum: Arthropoda
- Class: Insecta
- Order: Coleoptera
- Suborder: Polyphaga
- Infraorder: Cucujiformia
- Family: Cerambycidae
- Tribe: Desmiphorini
- Genus: Ussurella; Danilevsky, 1997
- Species: U. napolovi

Binomial name
- Ussurella napolovi (Danilevsky, 1995)

Synonyms
- Ussuria napolovi Danilevsky, 1995

Genus of beetles

Ussurella is a monotypic beetle genus in the family Cerambycidae described by Mikhail Leontievich Danilevsky in 1997. Its only species, Ussurella napolovi, was first described by the same author two years earlier in the genus Ussuria, but that genus name was preoccupied by an ammonite.
