= Nicarete perrieri =

Scientific classification
- Kingdom: Animalia
- Phylum: Arthropoda
- Class: Insecta
- Order: Coleoptera
- Suborder: Polyphaga
- Infraorder: Cucujiformia
- Family: Cerambycidae
- Genus: Nicarete
- Species: N. perrieri

Binomial name
- Nicarete perrieri Fairmaire, 1898

Species of beetle

Nicarete perrieri is a species of beetle in the family Cerambycidae. It was described by Fairmaire in 1898.

== Subspecies ==
- Nicarete perrieri continentalis Breuning, 1949
- Nicarete perrieri perrieri (Fairmaire, 1898)
