= Trichadjinga =

Scientific classification
- Kingdom: Animalia
- Phylum: Arthropoda
- Class: Insecta
- Order: Coleoptera
- Suborder: Polyphaga
- Infraorder: Cucujiformia
- Family: Cerambycidae
- Subfamily: Lamiinae
- Tribe: Desmiphorini
- Genus: Trichadjinga
- Species: T. batchianensis

Binomial name
- Trichadjinga batchianensis Breuning, 1975

Genus of beetles

Trichadjinga batchianensis is a species of beetle in the family Cerambycidae, and the only species in the genus Trichadjinga. It was described by Breuning in 1975.

This species has been observed on the Molucca Islands of Indonesia.
