= Nicarete cineraria =

Scientific classification
- Kingdom: Animalia
- Phylum: Arthropoda
- Class: Insecta
- Order: Coleoptera
- Suborder: Polyphaga
- Infraorder: Cucujiformia
- Family: Cerambycidae
- Genus: Nicarete
- Species: N. cineraria

Binomial name
- Nicarete cineraria Fairmaire, 1900

Species of beetle

Nicarete cineraria is a species of beetle in the family Cerambycidae. It was described by Fairmaire in 1900.
