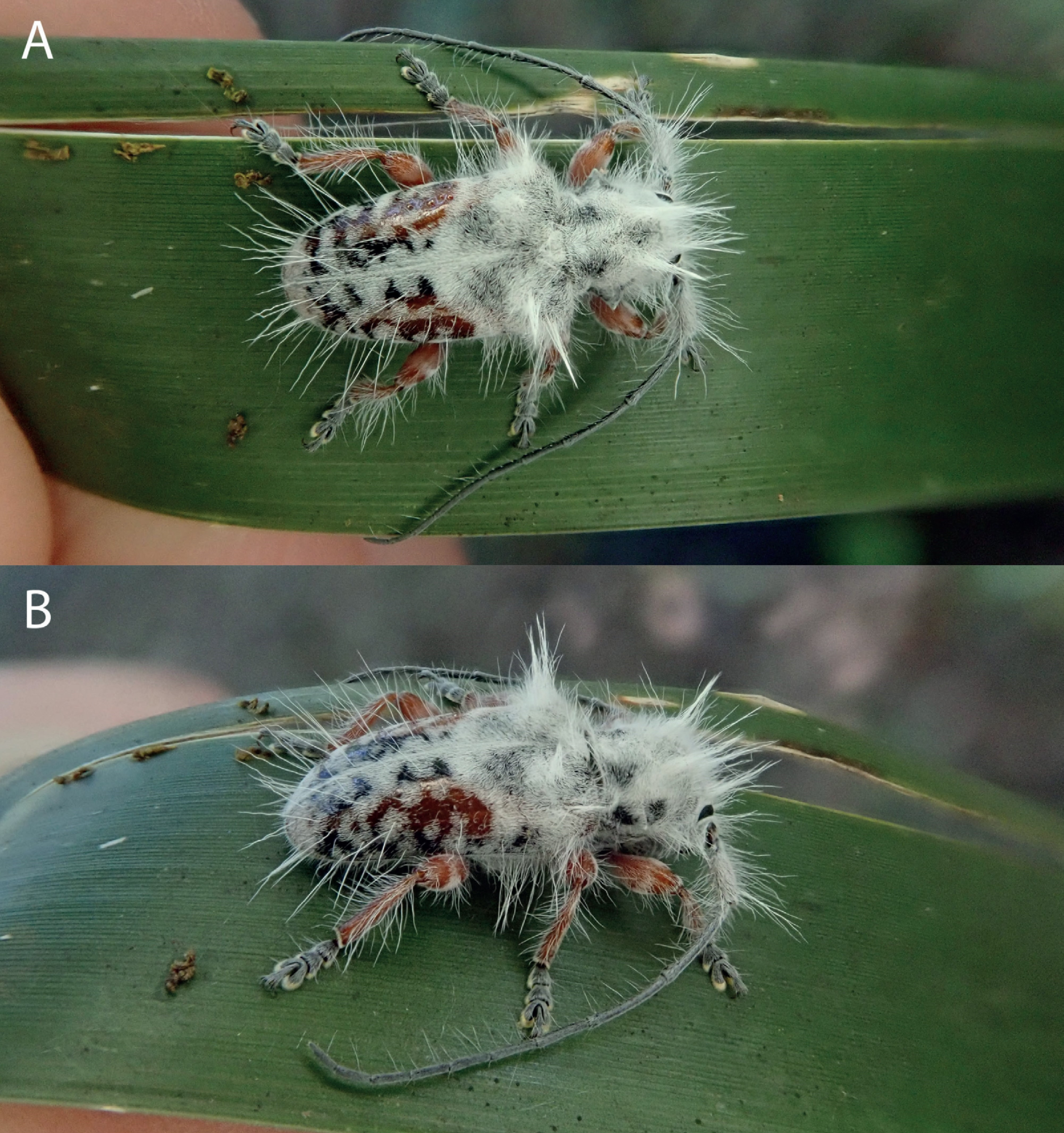

Scientific classification
- Kingdom: Animalia
- Phylum: Arthropoda
- Clade: Pancrustacea
- Class: Insecta
- Order: Coleoptera
- Suborder: Polyphaga
- Infraorder: Cucujiformia
- Family: Cerambycidae
- Tribe: Desmiphorini
- Genus: Excastra; Tweed, Ashman & Ślipiński, 2024
- Species: E. albopilosa

Binomial name
- Excastra albopilosa Tweed, Ashman & Ślipiński, 2024

= Excastra =

Genus of beetles

Excastra is a genus of beetles in the family Cerambycidae. It is monotypic, with only species Excastra albopilosa. The beetle is furry, and is thought to have evolved to mimic an insect that has been killed by a fungus, as a way of deterring predators.

The holotype of Excastra albopilosa is the only known specimen and measures 9.7 mm (0.38 in) in total length.
