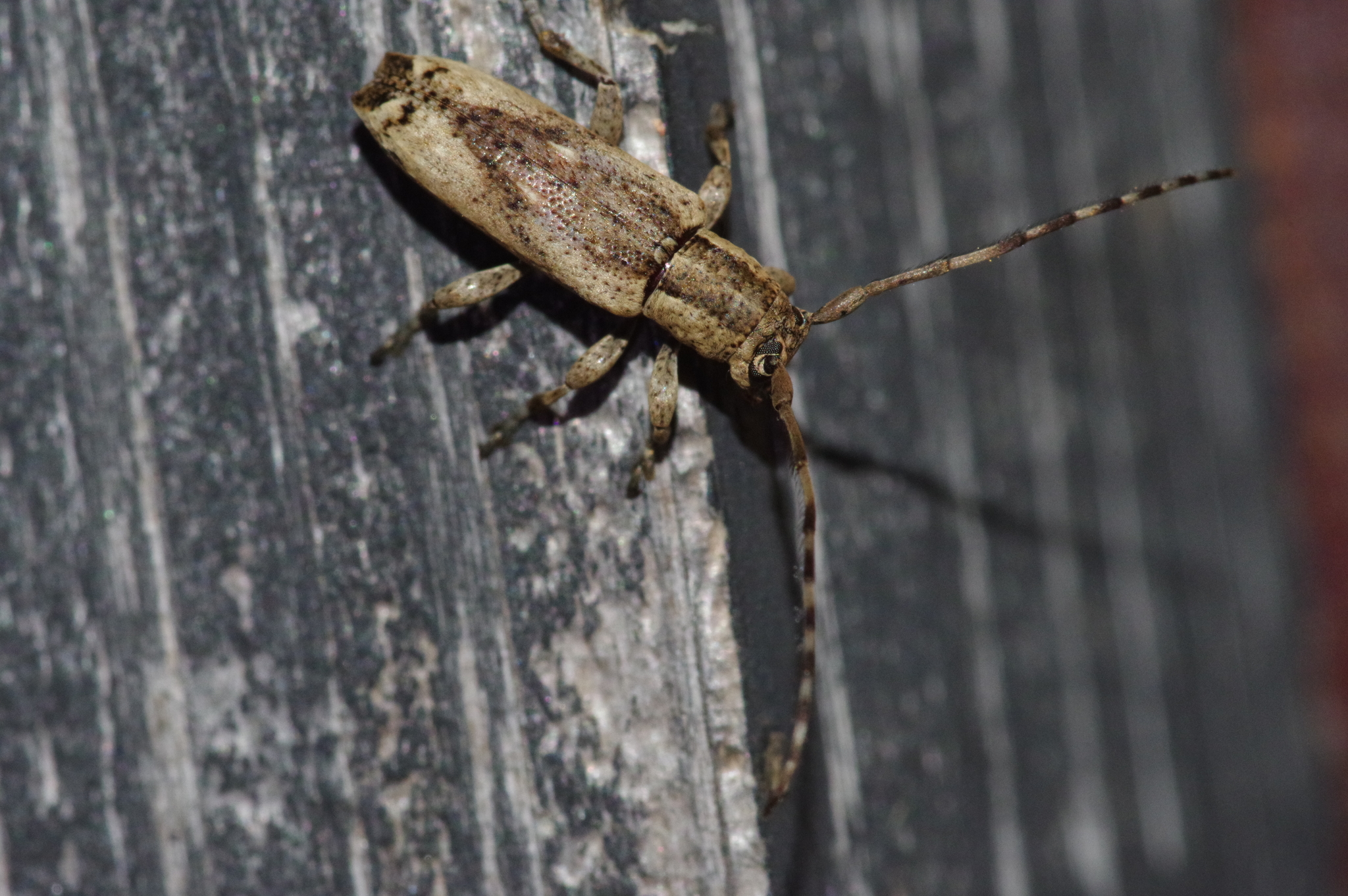
- Mimectatina meridiana, Okinawa, Japan

Scientific classification
- Domain: Eukaryota
- Kingdom: Animalia
- Phylum: Arthropoda
- Class: Insecta
- Order: Coleoptera
- Suborder: Polyphaga
- Infraorder: Cucujiformia
- Family: Cerambycidae
- Subfamily: Lamiinae
- Tribe: Desmiphorini
- Genus: Mimectatina; Aurivillius, 1928

Synonyms
- Doius Matsushita, 1933; Falsodoius Breuning, 1953; Parasydonia Breuning, 1949

= Mimectatina =

Genus of beetles

Mimectatina is a genus of flat-faced longhorns in the beetle family Cerambycidae. There are about 15 described species in Mimectatina.

== Species ==
These 15 species belong to the genus Mimectatina:

- Mimectatina apicefusca Breuning, 1966
- Mimectatina celebensis Breuning, 1975
- Mimectatina celebica Breuning, 1975
- Mimectatina divaricata (Bates, 1884)
- Mimectatina divericata (Bates, 1884)
- Mimectatina fukudai (Hayashi, 1969)
- Mimectatina fuscoapicata (Breuning, 1964)
- Mimectatina fuscoplagiata (Breuning, 1939)
- Mimectatina iriei Hayashi, 1984
- Mimectatina longipennis Makihara, 2004
- Mimectatina meridiana (Matsushita, 1933)
- Mimectatina murakamii Hayashi, 1978
- Mimectatina singularis Aurivillius, 1927
- Mimectatina truncatipennis (Pic, 1944)
- Mimectatina variegata Kusama & Takakuwa, 1984
