= Ptericoptomimus =

Scientific classification
- Kingdom: Animalia
- Phylum: Arthropoda
- Clade: Pancrustacea
- Class: Insecta
- Order: Coleoptera
- Suborder: Polyphaga
- Infraorder: Cucujiformia
- Family: Cerambycidae
- Subfamily: Lamiinae
- Tribe: Desmiphorini
- Genus: Ptericoptomimus
- Species: P. truncatus

Binomial name
- Ptericoptomimus truncatus Melzer, 1935

Synonyms
- Estola truncata Breuning, 1940; Ptericoptus truncatus Monné & Giesbert, 1992

Genus of beetles

Ptericoptomimus truncatus is a species of beetle in the Cerambycidae family, and the only species in the genus Ptericoptomimus. It is found in Brazil.

It was described by Melzer in 1935.
