= Myonebrides sexpunctata =

Scientific classification
- Kingdom: Animalia
- Phylum: Arthropoda
- Class: Insecta
- Order: Coleoptera
- Suborder: Polyphaga
- Infraorder: Cucujiformia
- Family: Cerambycidae
- Genus: Myonebrides
- Species: M. sexpunctata

Binomial name
- Myonebrides sexpunctata Breuning, 1957

Species of beetle

Myonebrides sexpunctata is a species of beetle in the family Cerambycidae. It was described by Stephan von Breuning in 1957.
