= Bucynthia spiloptera =

Scientific classification
- Kingdom: Animalia
- Phylum: Arthropoda
- Class: Insecta
- Order: Coleoptera
- Suborder: Polyphaga
- Infraorder: Cucujiformia
- Family: Cerambycidae
- Genus: Bucynthia
- Species: B. spiloptera

Binomial name
- Bucynthia spiloptera (Pascoe, 1863)

Species of beetle

Bucynthia spiloptera is a species of beetle in the family Cerambycidae. It was described by Pascoe in 1863. It is known from Australia.

== Subspecies ==
- Bucynthia spiloptera fuscobrunnea Aurivillius, 1893
- Bucynthia spiloptera spiloptera (Pascoe, 1863)
