= Nicarete albolineata =

Scientific classification
- Kingdom: Animalia
- Phylum: Arthropoda
- Class: Insecta
- Order: Coleoptera
- Suborder: Polyphaga
- Infraorder: Cucujiformia
- Family: Cerambycidae
- Genus: Nicarete
- Species: N. albolineata

Binomial name
- Nicarete albolineata Fairmaire, 1904

Species of beetle

Nicarete albolineata is a species of beetle in the family Cerambycidae. It was described by Fairmaire in 1904.
