= Iurubanga =

Scientific classification
- Domain: Eukaryota
- Kingdom: Animalia
- Phylum: Arthropoda
- Class: Insecta
- Order: Coleoptera
- Suborder: Polyphaga
- Infraorder: Cucujiformia
- Family: Cerambycidae
- Subfamily: Lamiinae
- Tribe: Desmiphorini
- Genus: Iurubanga
- Species: I. arixi

Binomial name
- Iurubanga arixi Martins & Galileo, 1996

Genus of beetles

Iurubanga arixi is a species of beetle in the family Cerambycidae, and the only species in the genus Iurubanga, found in Brazil. It was described by Martins and Galileo in 1996.
