= Cylindilla makiharai =

Scientific classification
- Domain: Eukaryota
- Kingdom: Animalia
- Phylum: Arthropoda
- Class: Insecta
- Order: Coleoptera
- Suborder: Polyphaga
- Infraorder: Cucujiformia
- Family: Cerambycidae
- Genus: Cylindilla
- Species: C. makiharai

Binomial name
- Cylindilla makiharai Hasegawa, 1992

Species of beetle

Cylindilla makiharai is a species of beetle in the family Cerambycidae. It was described by Hasegawa in 1992.
