= Mimasyngenes inlineatus =

Scientific classification
- Kingdom: Animalia
- Phylum: Arthropoda
- Class: Insecta
- Order: Coleoptera
- Suborder: Polyphaga
- Infraorder: Cucujiformia
- Family: Cerambycidae
- Genus: Mimasyngenes
- Species: M. inlineatus

Binomial name
- Mimasyngenes inlineatus Breuning, 1956

Species of beetle

Mimasyngenes inlineatus is a species of beetle in the family Cerambycidae. It was described by Stephan von Breuning in 1956. It is known from Colombia and Venezuela.
