= Mimopogonius hovorei =

Scientific classification
- Kingdom: Animalia
- Phylum: Arthropoda
- Class: Insecta
- Order: Coleoptera
- Suborder: Polyphaga
- Infraorder: Cucujiformia
- Family: Cerambycidae
- Genus: Mimopogonius
- Species: M. hovorei

Binomial name
- Mimopogonius hovorei Martins & Galileo, 2009

Species of beetle

Mimopogonius hovorei is a species of beetle in the family Cerambycidae. It was described by Martins and Galileo in 2009. It is known from Ecuador.
