= Piimuna =

Scientific classification
- Kingdom: Animalia
- Phylum: Arthropoda
- Class: Insecta
- Order: Coleoptera
- Suborder: Polyphaga
- Infraorder: Cucujiformia
- Family: Cerambycidae
- Tribe: Desmiphorini
- Genus: Piimuna; Martins & Galileo, 1998
- Species: P. gibbosa

Binomial name
- Piimuna gibbosa Martins & Galileo, 1998

Genus of beetles

Piimuna is a genus of longhorned beetles in the family Cerambycidae. This genus has a single species, Piimuna gibbosa, found in Brazil.
