= Heteresmia turbata =

Scientific classification
- Kingdom: Animalia
- Phylum: Arthropoda
- Class: Insecta
- Order: Coleoptera
- Suborder: Polyphaga
- Infraorder: Cucujiformia
- Family: Cerambycidae
- Genus: Heteresmia
- Species: H. turbata

Binomial name
- Heteresmia turbata (Pascoe, 1859)

Synonyms
- Esmia turbata Pascoe, 1859

Species of beetle

Heteresmia turbata is a species of beetle in the family Cerambycidae. It was described by Pascoe in 1859. It is known from Brazil and Ecuador.
