= Mimalblymoroides =

Scientific classification
- Kingdom: Animalia
- Phylum: Arthropoda
- Class: Insecta
- Order: Coleoptera
- Suborder: Polyphaga
- Infraorder: Cucujiformia
- Family: Cerambycidae
- Tribe: Desmiphorini
- Genus: Mimalblymoroides; Breuning, 1969

Genus of beetles

Mimalblymoroides is a genus of longhorn beetles of the subfamily Lamiinae, which contains the following species:

- Mimalblymoroides freudei Breuning, 1973
- Mimalblymoroides heinrichi Breuning, 1973
- Mimalblymoroides kaszabi (Breuning, 1969)
- Mimalblymoroides spinipennis (Breuning, 1970)
