= Cylindilla =

Scientific classification
- Domain: Eukaryota
- Kingdom: Animalia
- Phylum: Arthropoda
- Class: Insecta
- Order: Coleoptera
- Suborder: Polyphaga
- Infraorder: Cucujiformia
- Family: Cerambycidae
- Subfamily: Lamiinae
- Tribe: Desmiphorini
- Genus: Cylindilla; Bates, 1884

Synonyms
- Ascoldatimura Breuning, 1960; Mimatimura Breuning, 1958; Pseudanesthetis Pic, 1922; Anaesthetomorphus Pic, 1929

Genus of beetles

Cylindilla is a genus of longhorn beetles of the subfamily Lamiinae.

== Species ==
Cylindilla contains the following species:

- Cylindilla grisescens Bates, 1884
- Cylindilla inornata (Gressitt, 1951)
- Cylindilla makiharai Hasegawa, 1992
