= Nicarete villosicornis =

Scientific classification
- Kingdom: Animalia
- Phylum: Arthropoda
- Class: Insecta
- Order: Coleoptera
- Suborder: Polyphaga
- Infraorder: Cucujiformia
- Family: Cerambycidae
- Genus: Nicarete
- Species: N. villosicornis

Binomial name
- Nicarete villosicornis (Fairmaire, 1896)

Species of beetle

Nicarete villosicornis is a species of beetle in the family Cerambycidae. It was described by Fairmaire in 1896.
