= Gibbestola griseovaria =

Scientific classification
- Kingdom: Animalia
- Phylum: Arthropoda
- Class: Insecta
- Order: Coleoptera
- Suborder: Polyphaga
- Infraorder: Cucujiformia
- Family: Cerambycidae
- Genus: Gibbestola
- Species: G. griseovaria

Binomial name
- Gibbestola griseovaria Breuning, 1940

Species of beetle

Gibbestola griseovaria is a species of beetle in the family Cerambycidae. It was described by Stephan von Breuning in 1940. It is known from Brazil.
