= Anisopeplus =

Scientific classification
- Kingdom: Animalia
- Phylum: Arthropoda
- Clade: Pancrustacea
- Class: Insecta
- Order: Coleoptera
- Suborder: Polyphaga
- Infraorder: Cucujiformia
- Family: Cerambycidae
- Tribe: Desmiphorini
- Genus: Anisopeplus
- Species: A. perplexus

Binomial name
- Anisopeplus perplexus Melzer, 1934

Genus of beetles

Anisopeplus is a genus of beetles in the family Cerambycidae, containing a single species, Anisopeplus perplexus. It was described by Melzer in 1934.
