= Sormidomorpha =

Scientific classification
- Kingdom: Animalia
- Phylum: Arthropoda
- Class: Insecta
- Order: Coleoptera
- Suborder: Polyphaga
- Infraorder: Cucujiformia
- Family: Cerambycidae
- Tribe: Desmiphorini
- Genus: Sormidomorpha; Aurivillius, 1920
- Species: S. unicolor

Binomial name
- Sormidomorpha unicolor Aurivillius, 1920

Genus of beetle

Sormidomorpha is a monotypic beetle genus in the family Cerambycidae described by Per Olof Christopher Aurivillius in 1920. Its single species, Sormidomorpha unicolor, was described by the same author in the same year.
