= Bucynthia borchmanni =

Scientific classification
- Kingdom: Animalia
- Phylum: Arthropoda
- Class: Insecta
- Order: Coleoptera
- Suborder: Polyphaga
- Infraorder: Cucujiformia
- Family: Cerambycidae
- Genus: Bucynthia
- Species: B. borchmanni

Binomial name
- Bucynthia borchmanni (Breuning, 1959)

Synonyms
- Spinostenellipsis borchmanni Breuning, 1959

Species of beetles

Bucynthia borchmanni is a species of beetle in the family Cerambycidae. It was described by Stephan von Breuning in 1959. It is known from Australia.
