= Pentacosmia =

Scientific classification
- Kingdom: Animalia
- Phylum: Arthropoda
- Clade: Pancrustacea
- Class: Insecta
- Order: Coleoptera
- Suborder: Polyphaga
- Infraorder: Cucujiformia
- Family: Cerambycidae
- Tribe: Desmiphorini
- Genus: Pentacosmia; Newman, 1842

Synonyms
- Mimancita Breuning, 1938

Genus of insects

Pentacosmia is a genus of longhorn beetles in the subfamily Lamiinae. It is endemic to Australia.

== Species ==
There are four recognized species:

- Pentacosmia cacioides (Breuning, 1938)
- Pentacosmia conferta (Pascoe, 1863)
- Pentacosmia scoparia Newman, 1842
- Pentacosmia tasmanica Breuning, 1968
