= Fallaxdesmis =

Scientific classification
- Domain: Eukaryota
- Kingdom: Animalia
- Phylum: Arthropoda
- Class: Insecta
- Order: Coleoptera
- Suborder: Polyphaga
- Infraorder: Cucujiformia
- Family: Cerambycidae
- Tribe: Desmiphorini
- Genus: Fallaxdesmis; Santos-Silva & Wappes, 2018

Species of beetle

Fallaxdesmis is a genus of beetle in the family Cerambycidae. It was described by Santos-Silva & Wappes in 2018 and contains the single species; Fallaxdesmis unicolor.
