= Icublabia =

Scientific classification
- Domain: Eukaryota
- Kingdom: Animalia
- Phylum: Arthropoda
- Class: Insecta
- Order: Coleoptera
- Suborder: Polyphaga
- Infraorder: Cucujiformia
- Family: Cerambycidae
- Tribe: Desmiphorini
- Genus: Icublabia; Galileo & Martins, 2003
- Species: I. multispinosa

Binomial name
- Icublabia multispinosa Galileo & Martins, 2003

Genus of beetles

Icublabia is a genus of flat-faced longhorns in the beetle family Cerambycidae. This genus has a single species, Icublabia multispinosa, found in Colombia and Ecuador.
