= Mimalblymoroides kaszabi =

Scientific classification
- Kingdom: Animalia
- Phylum: Arthropoda
- Class: Insecta
- Order: Coleoptera
- Suborder: Polyphaga
- Infraorder: Cucujiformia
- Family: Cerambycidae
- Genus: Mimalblymoroides
- Species: M. kaszabi

Binomial name
- Mimalblymoroides kaszabi (Breuning, 1969)

Synonyms
- Mimamblymora kaszabi Breuning, 1969

Species of beetle

Mimalblymoroides kaszabi is a species of beetle in the family Cerambycidae. It was described by Stephan von Breuning in 1969. It is known from Papua New Guinea.
