= Neocolobura =

Scientific classification
- Kingdom: Animalia
- Phylum: Arthropoda
- Class: Insecta
- Order: Coleoptera
- Suborder: Polyphaga
- Infraorder: Cucujiformia
- Family: Cerambycidae
- Tribe: Desmiphorini
- Genus: Neocolobura; Monné, 2005
- Species: N. alboplagiata

Binomial name
- Neocolobura alboplagiata (Blanchard in Gay, 1851)

Genus of beetles

Neocolobura alboplagiata is a species of beetle in the family Cerambycidae, and the only species in the genus Neocolobura. It was described by Blanchard in 1851.
