= Cylindilla grisescens =

Scientific classification
- Domain: Eukaryota
- Kingdom: Animalia
- Phylum: Arthropoda
- Class: Insecta
- Order: Coleoptera
- Suborder: Polyphaga
- Infraorder: Cucujiformia
- Family: Cerambycidae
- Genus: Cylindilla
- Species: C. grisescens

Binomial name
- Cylindilla grisescens Bates, 1884

Synonyms
- Askoldatimura askoldensis (Heyden, 1884); Atimura askoldensis Heyden, 1884; Mimatimura askoldensis (Heyden, 1884)

Species of beetle

Cylindilla grisescens is a species of beetle in the family Cerambycidae. It was described by Henry Walter Bates in 1884. It is known from Japan.
