= Chaetacanthidius =

Scientific classification
- Kingdom: Animalia
- Phylum: Arthropoda
- Class: Insecta
- Order: Coleoptera
- Suborder: Polyphaga
- Infraorder: Cucujiformia
- Family: Cerambycidae
- Genus: Chaetacanthidius
- Species: C. unifasciatus

Binomial name
- Chaetacanthidius unifasciatus Gilmour, 1948

Genus of beetles

Chaetacanthidius unifasciatus is a species of beetle in the family Cerambycidae, and the only species in the genus Chaetacanthidius. It was described by Gilmour in 1948.
