= Pseudocentruropsis =

Scientific classification
- Kingdom: Animalia
- Phylum: Arthropoda
- Class: Insecta
- Order: Coleoptera
- Suborder: Polyphaga
- Infraorder: Cucujiformia
- Family: Cerambycidae
- Genus: Pseudocentruropsis
- Species: P. flavosignata

Binomial name
- Pseudocentruropsis flavosignata Breuning, 1961

Genus of beetles

Pseudocentruropsis flavosignata is a species of beetles in the family Cerambycidae, and the only species in the genus Pseudocentruropsis. It was described by Breuning in 1961. The species have elongated body.
