= Micratelodesmis =

Scientific classification
- Kingdom: Animalia
- Phylum: Arthropoda
- Class: Insecta
- Order: Coleoptera
- Suborder: Polyphaga
- Infraorder: Cucujiformia
- Family: Cerambycidae
- Genus: Micratelodesmis
- Species: M. minor

Binomial name
- Micratelodesmis minor Martins & Galileo, 2012

Genus of beetles

Micratelodesmis minor is a species of beetle in the family Cerambycidae, and the only species in the genus Micratelodesmis. It was described by Martins and Galileo in 2012. It is known from Costa Rica.
