= Paroricopis =

Scientific classification
- Kingdom: Animalia
- Phylum: Arthropoda
- Class: Insecta
- Order: Coleoptera
- Suborder: Polyphaga
- Infraorder: Cucujiformia
- Family: Cerambycidae
- Genus: Paroricopis
- Species: P. latefasciatus

Binomial name
- Paroricopis latefasciatus Breuning, 1958

Genus of beetles

Paroricopis latefasciatus is a species of beetle in the family Cerambycidae, and the only species in the genus Paroricopis. It was described by Breuning in 1958.
