= Paratimiola =

Scientific classification
- Kingdom: Animalia
- Phylum: Arthropoda
- Clade: Pancrustacea
- Class: Insecta
- Order: Coleoptera
- Suborder: Polyphaga
- Infraorder: Cucujiformia
- Family: Cerambycidae
- Genus: Paratimiola
- Species: P. rondoni

Binomial name
- Paratimiola rondoni Breuning, 1965

Genus of beetles

Paratimiola is a monotypic genus of beetle in the family Cerambycidae, containing only the species Paratimiola rondoni. It was described by Breuning in 1965.
