= Falsohyagnis =

Scientific classification
- Kingdom: Animalia
- Phylum: Arthropoda
- Class: Insecta
- Order: Coleoptera
- Suborder: Polyphaga
- Infraorder: Cucujiformia
- Family: Cerambycidae
- Genus: Falsohyagnis
- Species: F. preapicemaculata

Binomial name
- Falsohyagnis preapicemaculata Breuning, 1940

Genus of beetles

Falsohyagnis preapicemaculata is a species of beetle in the family Cerambycidae, and the only species in the genus Falsohyagnis. It was described by Breuning in 1940.
