= Bulborhodopis =

Scientific classification
- Kingdom: Animalia
- Phylum: Arthropoda
- Class: Insecta
- Order: Coleoptera
- Suborder: Polyphaga
- Infraorder: Cucujiformia
- Family: Cerambycidae
- Genus: Bulborhodopis
- Species: B. barbicornis

Binomial name
- Bulborhodopis barbicornis Breuning, 1948

Genus of beetles

Bulborhodopis barbicornis is a species of beetle in the family Cerambycidae, and the only species in the genus Bulborhodopis. It was described by Breuning in 1948.
