= Falsatimura =

Scientific classification
- Kingdom: Animalia
- Phylum: Arthropoda
- Class: Insecta
- Order: Coleoptera
- Suborder: Polyphaga
- Infraorder: Cucujiformia
- Family: Cerambycidae
- Genus: Falsatimura
- Species: F. grisescens

Binomial name
- Falsatimura grisescens Pic, 1926

Genus of beetles

Falsatimura grisescens is a species of beetle in the family Cerambycidae, and the only species in the genus Falsatimura. It was described by Pic in 1926.
