= Trichestola =

Scientific classification
- Kingdom: Animalia
- Phylum: Arthropoda
- Class: Insecta
- Order: Coleoptera
- Suborder: Polyphaga
- Infraorder: Cucujiformia
- Family: Cerambycidae
- Genus: Trichestola
- Species: T. guatemalana

Binomial name
- Trichestola guatemalana Breuning, 1950

Genus of beetles

Trichestola guatemalana is a species of beetle in the family Cerambycidae, and the only species in the genus Trichestola. It was described by Breuning in 1950.
