= Mimolophia =

Scientific classification
- Kingdom: Animalia
- Phylum: Arthropoda
- Class: Insecta
- Order: Coleoptera
- Suborder: Polyphaga
- Infraorder: Cucujiformia
- Family: Cerambycidae
- Genus: Mimolophia
- Species: M. brunnea

Binomial name
- Mimolophia brunnea Breuning, 1940

Genus of beetles

Mimolophia brunnea is a species of beetle in the family Cerambycidae, and the only species in the genus Mimolophia. It was described by Breuning in 1940.
