= Mimeremon =

Scientific classification
- Kingdom: Animalia
- Phylum: Arthropoda
- Class: Insecta
- Order: Coleoptera
- Suborder: Polyphaga
- Infraorder: Cucujiformia
- Family: Cerambycidae
- Genus: Mimeremon
- Species: M. flavovittatum

Binomial name
- Mimeremon flavovittatum Breuning, 1967

Genus of beetles

Mimeremon flavovittatum is a species of beetle in the family Cerambycidae, and the only species in the genus Mimeremon. It was described by Breuning in 1967.
