= Cyocyphax =

Scientific classification
- Kingdom: Animalia
- Phylum: Arthropoda
- Class: Insecta
- Order: Coleoptera
- Suborder: Polyphaga
- Infraorder: Cucujiformia
- Family: Cerambycidae
- Genus: Cyocyphax
- Species: C. praonetoides

Binomial name
- Cyocyphax praonetoides Thomson, 1878

Genus of beetles

Cyocyphax praonetoides is a species of beetle in the family Cerambycidae, and the only species in the genus Cyocyphax. It was described by James Thomson in 1878.
