= Dorcaschesis =

Scientific classification
- Kingdom: Animalia
- Phylum: Arthropoda
- Class: Insecta
- Order: Coleoptera
- Suborder: Polyphaga
- Infraorder: Cucujiformia
- Family: Cerambycidae
- Genus: Dorcaschesis
- Species: D. sericata

Binomial name
- Dorcaschesis sericata Heller, 1924

Genus of beetles

Dorcaschesis sericata is a species of beetle in the family Cerambycidae, and the only species in the genus Dorcaschesis. It was described by Heller in 1924.
