= Mimodystasia =

Scientific classification
- Kingdom: Animalia
- Phylum: Arthropoda
- Class: Insecta
- Order: Coleoptera
- Suborder: Polyphaga
- Infraorder: Cucujiformia
- Family: Cerambycidae
- Genus: Mimodystasia
- Species: M. mjoebergi

Binomial name
- Mimodystasia mjoebergi Breuning, 1956

Genus of beetles

Mimodystasia mjoebergi is a species of beetle in the family Cerambycidae, and the only species in the genus Mimodystasia. It was described by Breuning in 1956.
