= Parablabicentrus =

Scientific classification
- Domain: Eukaryota
- Kingdom: Animalia
- Phylum: Arthropoda
- Class: Insecta
- Order: Coleoptera
- Suborder: Polyphaga
- Infraorder: Cucujiformia
- Family: Cerambycidae
- Genus: Parablabicentrus
- Species: P. angustatus

Binomial name
- Parablabicentrus angustatus (Bates, 1866)

Genus of beetles

Parablabicentrus angustatus is a species of beetle in the family Cerambycidae, and the only species in the genus Parablabicentrus. It was described by Henry Walter Bates in 1866.
