= Laoterinaea =

Scientific classification
- Kingdom: Animalia
- Phylum: Arthropoda
- Class: Insecta
- Order: Coleoptera
- Suborder: Polyphaga
- Infraorder: Cucujiformia
- Family: Cerambycidae
- Genus: Laoterinaea
- Species: L. flavovittata

Binomial name
- Laoterinaea flavovittata Breuning, 1965

Genus of beetles

Laoterinaea flavovittata is a species of beetle in the family Cerambycidae, and the only species in the genus Laoterinaea. It was described by Breuning in 1965.
