= Stenocentrura =

Scientific classification
- Kingdom: Animalia
- Phylum: Arthropoda
- Class: Insecta
- Order: Coleoptera
- Suborder: Polyphaga
- Infraorder: Cucujiformia
- Family: Cerambycidae
- Genus: Stenocentrura
- Species: S. albomaculata

Binomial name
- Stenocentrura albomaculata Breuning, 1948

Genus of beetles

Stenocentrura albomaculata is a species of beetle in the family Cerambycidae, and the only species in the genus Stenocentrura. It was described by Breuning in 1948.
