= Thereselia =

Scientific classification
- Kingdom: Animalia
- Phylum: Arthropoda
- Class: Insecta
- Order: Coleoptera
- Suborder: Polyphaga
- Infraorder: Cucujiformia
- Family: Cerambycidae
- Genus: Thereselia
- Species: T. modesta

Binomial name
- Thereselia modesta Pic, 1946

Genus of beetles

Thereselia modesta is a species of beetle in the family Cerambycidae, and the only species in the genus Thereselia. It was described by Maurice Pic in 1946.
