= Lamiessa =

Scientific classification
- Kingdom: Animalia
- Phylum: Arthropoda
- Class: Insecta
- Order: Coleoptera
- Suborder: Polyphaga
- Infraorder: Cucujiformia
- Family: Cerambycidae
- Genus: Lamiessa
- Species: L. eumolpoides

Binomial name
- Lamiessa eumolpoides Bates, 1885

Genus of beetles

Lamiessa eumolpoides is a species of beetle in the family Cerambycidae, and the only species in the genus Lamiessa. It was described by Bates in 1885.
