= Pareuseboides =

Scientific classification
- Kingdom: Animalia
- Phylum: Arthropoda
- Class: Insecta
- Order: Coleoptera
- Suborder: Polyphaga
- Infraorder: Cucujiformia
- Family: Cerambycidae
- Genus: Pareuseboides
- Species: P. albomarmoratus

Binomial name
- Pareuseboides albomarmoratus Breuning, 1948

Genus of beetles

Pareuseboides albomarmoratus is a species of beetle in the family Cerambycidae, and the only species in the genus Pareuseboides. It was described by Breuning in 1948.
