= Atimiliopsis =

Scientific classification
- Kingdom: Animalia
- Phylum: Arthropoda
- Class: Insecta
- Order: Coleoptera
- Suborder: Polyphaga
- Infraorder: Cucujiformia
- Family: Cerambycidae
- Genus: Atimiliopsis
- Species: A. ochripennis

Binomial name
- Atimiliopsis ochripennis Breuning, 1974

Genus of beetles

Atimiliopsis ochripennis is a species of beetle in the family Cerambycidae, and the only species in the genus Atimiliopsis. It was described by Austrian entomologist Stephan von Breuning in 1974.
