= Mimothelais =

Scientific classification
- Kingdom: Animalia
- Phylum: Arthropoda
- Clade: Pancrustacea
- Class: Insecta
- Order: Coleoptera
- Suborder: Polyphaga
- Infraorder: Cucujiformia
- Family: Cerambycidae
- Genus: Mimothelais
- Species: M. fruhstorferi

Binomial name
- Mimothelais fruhstorferi Breuning, 1958

Genus of beetles

Mimothelais is a genus of beetle in the family Cerambycidae, compromising of only one species, Mimothelais fruhstorferi. It was described by Stephan von Breuning (entomologist) in 1958.
