= Ectatina =

Scientific classification
- Kingdom: Animalia
- Phylum: Arthropoda
- Class: Insecta
- Order: Coleoptera
- Suborder: Polyphaga
- Infraorder: Cucujiformia
- Family: Cerambycidae
- Genus: Ectatina
- Species: E. irrorata

Binomial name
- Ectatina irrorata Gahan, 1907

Genus of beetles

Ectatina irrorata is a species of beetle in the family Cerambycidae, and the only species in the genus Ectatina. It was described by Gahan in 1907.
