= Spinozorilispe =

Scientific classification
- Kingdom: Animalia
- Phylum: Arthropoda
- Class: Insecta
- Order: Coleoptera
- Suborder: Polyphaga
- Infraorder: Cucujiformia
- Family: Cerambycidae
- Genus: Spinozorilispe
- Species: S. fusca

Binomial name
- Spinozorilispe fusca Breuning, 1963

Genus of beetles

Spinozorilispe fusca is a species of beetle in the family Cerambycidae, and the only species in the genus Spinozorilispe. It was described by Breuning in 1963.
