= Falsorsidis =

Scientific classification
- Kingdom: Animalia
- Phylum: Arthropoda
- Class: Insecta
- Order: Coleoptera
- Suborder: Polyphaga
- Infraorder: Cucujiformia
- Family: Cerambycidae
- Genus: Falsorsidis
- Species: F. griseofasciatus

Binomial name
- Falsorsidis griseofasciatus (Pic, 1959)

Genus of beetles

Falsorsidis griseofasciatus is a species of beetle in the family Cerambycidae, and the only species in the genus Falsorsidis. It was described by Pic in 1959.
