= Tesapeus =

Scientific classification
- Kingdom: Animalia
- Phylum: Arthropoda
- Class: Insecta
- Order: Coleoptera
- Suborder: Polyphaga
- Infraorder: Cucujiformia
- Family: Cerambycidae
- Genus: Tesapeus
- Species: T. disjunctus

Binomial name
- Tesapeus disjunctus Galileo and Martins, 2012

Genus of beetles

Tesapeus disjunctus is a species of beetle in the family Cerambycidae, and the only species in the genus Tesapeus. It was described by Galileo and Martins in 2012. It is known from Costa Rica.
