= Scapeuseboides =

Scientific classification
- Kingdom: Animalia
- Phylum: Arthropoda
- Class: Insecta
- Order: Coleoptera
- Suborder: Polyphaga
- Infraorder: Cucujiformia
- Family: Cerambycidae
- Genus: Scapeuseboides
- Species: S. bicolor

Binomial name
- Scapeuseboides bicolor Breuning, 1958

Genus of beetles

Scapeuseboides bicolor is a species of beetle in the family Cerambycidae, and the only species in the genus Scapeuseboides. It was described by Stephan von Breuning in 1958.
