= Quasimesosella =

Scientific classification
- Kingdom: Animalia
- Phylum: Arthropoda
- Class: Insecta
- Order: Coleoptera
- Suborder: Polyphaga
- Infraorder: Cucujiformia
- Family: Cerambycidae
- Genus: Quasimesosella
- Species: Q. ussuriensis

Binomial name
- Quasimesosella ussuriensis (Cherepanov, 1984)

Genus of beetles

Quasimesosella ussuriensis is a species of beetle in the family Cerambycidae, and the only species in the genus Quasimesosella. It was described by Cherepanov in 1984.
