= Falsamblymora =

Scientific classification
- Kingdom: Animalia
- Phylum: Arthropoda
- Class: Insecta
- Order: Coleoptera
- Suborder: Polyphaga
- Infraorder: Cucujiformia
- Family: Cerambycidae
- Genus: Falsamblymora
- Species: F. tidorensis

Binomial name
- Falsamblymora tidorensis Breuning, 1959

Genus of beetles

Falsamblymora tidorensis is a species of beetle in the family Cerambycidae, and the only species in the genus Falsamblymora. It was described by Breuning in 1959.
