= Pseudischnolea =

Scientific classification
- Kingdom: Animalia
- Phylum: Arthropoda
- Clade: Pancrustacea
- Class: Insecta
- Order: Coleoptera
- Suborder: Polyphaga
- Infraorder: Cucujiformia
- Family: Cerambycidae
- Genus: Pseudischnolea
- Species: P. kaszabi

Binomial name
- Pseudischnolea kaszabi Breuning, 1953

Genus of beetles

Pseudischnolea kaszabi is a species of beetle in the family Cerambycidae, and the only species in the genus Pseudischnolea. It was described by Breuning in 1953.
