= Mimogyaritus =

Scientific classification
- Kingdom: Animalia
- Phylum: Arthropoda
- Class: Insecta
- Order: Coleoptera
- Suborder: Polyphaga
- Infraorder: Cucujiformia
- Family: Cerambycidae
- Genus: Mimogyaritus
- Species: M. fasciatus

Binomial name
- Mimogyaritus fasciatus Fisher, 1925

Genus of beetles

Mimogyaritus fasciatus is a species of beetle in the family Cerambycidae, and the only species in the genus Mimogyaritus. It was described by Fisher in 1925.
