= Sulenopsis =

Scientific classification
- Kingdom: Animalia
- Phylum: Arthropoda
- Class: Insecta
- Order: Coleoptera
- Suborder: Polyphaga
- Infraorder: Cucujiformia
- Family: Cerambycidae
- Genus: Sulenopsis
- Species: S. chrysovittata

Binomial name
- Sulenopsis chrysovittata Breuning, 1957

Genus of beetles

Sulenopsis chrysovittata is a species of beetle in the family Cerambycidae, and the only species in the genus Sulenopsis. It was described by Breuning in 1957.
