= Pseudonicarete =

Scientific classification
- Kingdom: Animalia
- Phylum: Arthropoda
- Class: Insecta
- Order: Coleoptera
- Suborder: Polyphaga
- Infraorder: Cucujiformia
- Family: Cerambycidae
- Genus: Pseudonicarete
- Species: P. peyrierasi

Binomial name
- Pseudonicarete peyrierasi Breuning, 1980

Genus of beetles

Pseudonicarete peyrierasi is a species of beetle in the family Cerambycidae, and the only species in the genus Pseudonicarete. It was described by Breuning in 1980.
