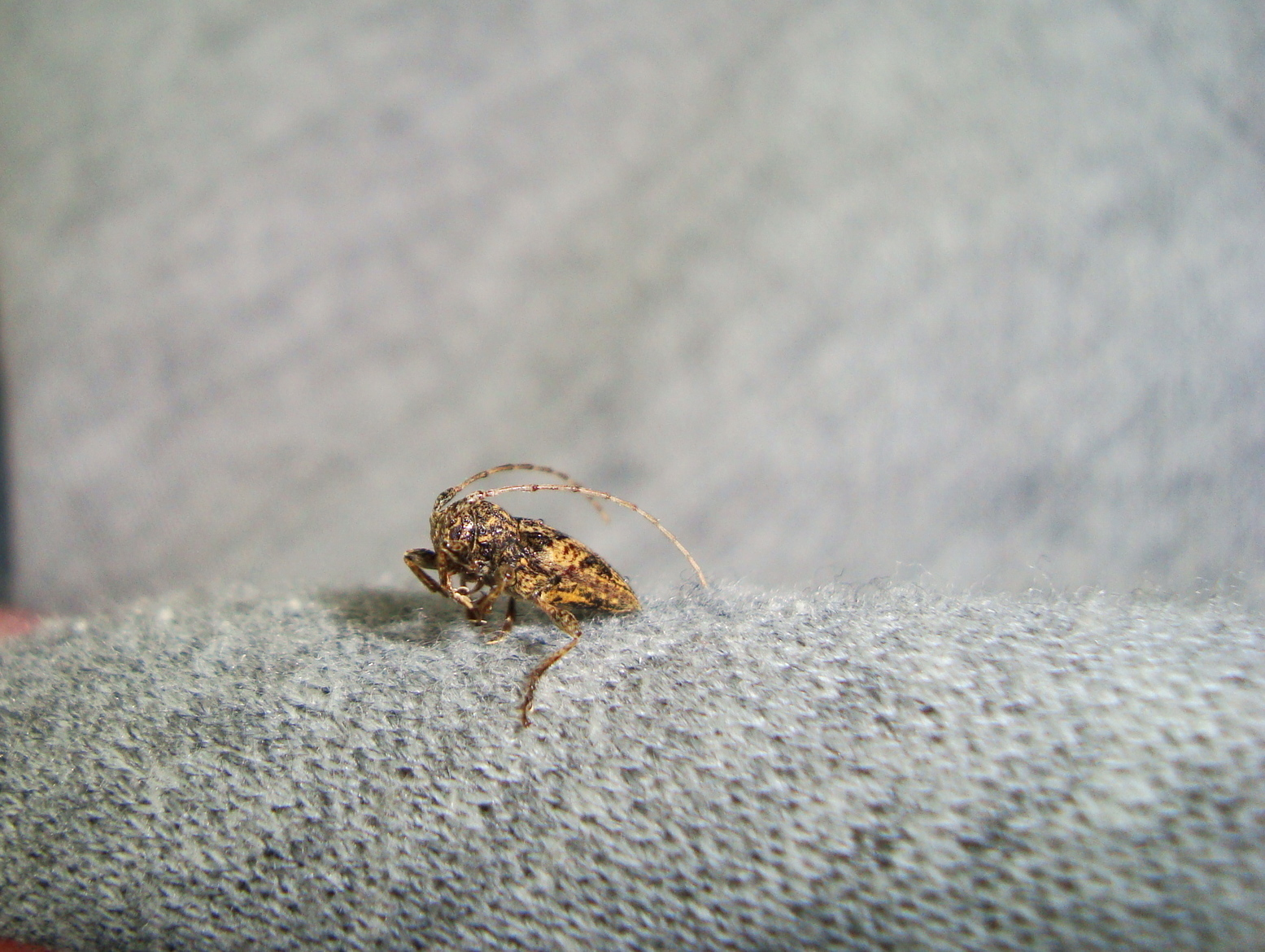

Scientific classification
- Kingdom: Animalia
- Phylum: Arthropoda
- Class: Insecta
- Order: Coleoptera
- Suborder: Polyphaga
- Infraorder: Cucujiformia
- Family: Cerambycidae
- Genus: Aconopteroides
- Species: A. laevipennis

Binomial name
- Aconopteroides laevipennis (Blanchard in Gay, 1851)

= Aconopteroides =

Genus of beetles

Aconopteroides is a genus of beetles in the family Cerambycidae, containing a single species, Aconopteroides laevipennis. It was described by Blanchard in 1851.
