= Disgregus =

Scientific classification
- Kingdom: Animalia
- Phylum: Arthropoda
- Class: Insecta
- Order: Coleoptera
- Suborder: Polyphaga
- Infraorder: Cucujiformia
- Family: Cerambycidae
- Genus: Disgregus
- Species: D. bezarki

Binomial name
- Disgregus bezarki Galileo & Martins, 2009

Genus of beetles

Disgregus bezarki is a species of beetle in the family Cerambycidae, and the only species in the genus Disgregus. It was described by Galileo and Martins in 2009.
