= Retilla =

Scientific classification
- Kingdom: Animalia
- Phylum: Arthropoda
- Class: Insecta
- Order: Coleoptera
- Suborder: Polyphaga
- Infraorder: Cucujiformia
- Family: Cerambycidae
- Genus: Retilla
- Species: R. indigens

Binomial name
- Retilla indigens Lacordaire, 1872

Genus of beetles

Retilla indigens is a species of beetle in the family Cerambycidae, and the only species in the genus Retilla. It was described by Lacordaire in 1872.
