= Oiceaca =

Scientific classification
- Domain: Eukaryota
- Kingdom: Animalia
- Phylum: Arthropoda
- Class: Insecta
- Order: Coleoptera
- Suborder: Polyphaga
- Infraorder: Cucujiformia
- Family: Cerambycidae
- Genus: Oiceaca
- Species: O. carenata

Binomial name
- Oiceaca carenata Martins & Galileo, 1998

Genus of beetles

Oiceaca carenata is a species of beetle in the family Cerambycidae, and the only species in the genus Oiceaca. It was described by Martins and Galileo in 1998.
