= Bonipogonius =

Scientific classification
- Kingdom: Animalia
- Phylum: Arthropoda
- Class: Insecta
- Order: Coleoptera
- Suborder: Polyphaga
- Infraorder: Cucujiformia
- Family: Cerambycidae
- Genus: Bonipogonius
- Species: B. fujitai

Binomial name
- Bonipogonius fujitai Kusama, 1974

Genus of beetles

Bonipogonius fujitai is a species of beetle in the family Cerambycidae, and the only species in the genus Bonipogonius. It was described by Kusama in 1974.
