= Paranaesthetis =

Scientific classification
- Kingdom: Animalia
- Phylum: Arthropoda
- Class: Insecta
- Order: Coleoptera
- Suborder: Polyphaga
- Infraorder: Cucujiformia
- Family: Cerambycidae
- Genus: Paranaesthetis
- Species: P. metallica

Binomial name
- Paranaesthetis metallica Breuning, 1982

Genus of beetles

Paranaesthetis metallica is a species of beetle in the family Cerambycidae, and the only species in the genus Paranaesthetis. It was described by Breuning in 1982.
