= Kerodiadelia =

Scientific classification
- Kingdom: Animalia
- Phylum: Arthropoda
- Class: Insecta
- Order: Coleoptera
- Suborder: Polyphaga
- Infraorder: Cucujiformia
- Family: Cerambycidae
- Genus: Kerodiadelia
- Species: K. capicola

Binomial name
- Kerodiadelia capicola Sudre & Téocchi, 2002

Genus of beetles

Kerodiadelia capicola is a species of beetle in the family Cerambycidae, and the only species in the genus Kerodiadelia. It was described by Sudre and Téocchi in 2002.
