= Mimomulciber =

Scientific classification
- Kingdom: Animalia
- Phylum: Arthropoda
- Class: Insecta
- Order: Coleoptera
- Suborder: Polyphaga
- Infraorder: Cucujiformia
- Family: Cerambycidae
- Genus: Mimomulciber
- Species: M. strandiellus

Binomial name
- Mimomulciber strandiellus Breuning, 1942

Genus of beetles

Mimomulciber strandiellus is a species of beetle in the family Cerambycidae, and the only species in the genus Mimomulciber. It was described by Breuning in 1942.
