= Parectatina =

Scientific classification
- Kingdom: Animalia
- Phylum: Arthropoda
- Class: Insecta
- Order: Coleoptera
- Suborder: Polyphaga
- Infraorder: Cucujiformia
- Family: Cerambycidae
- Genus: Parectatina
- Species: P. signata

Binomial name
- Parectatina signata (Gahan, 1907)

Genus of beetles

Parectatina signata is a species of beetle in the family Cerambycidae, and the only species in the genus Parectatina. It was described by Gahan in 1907.
