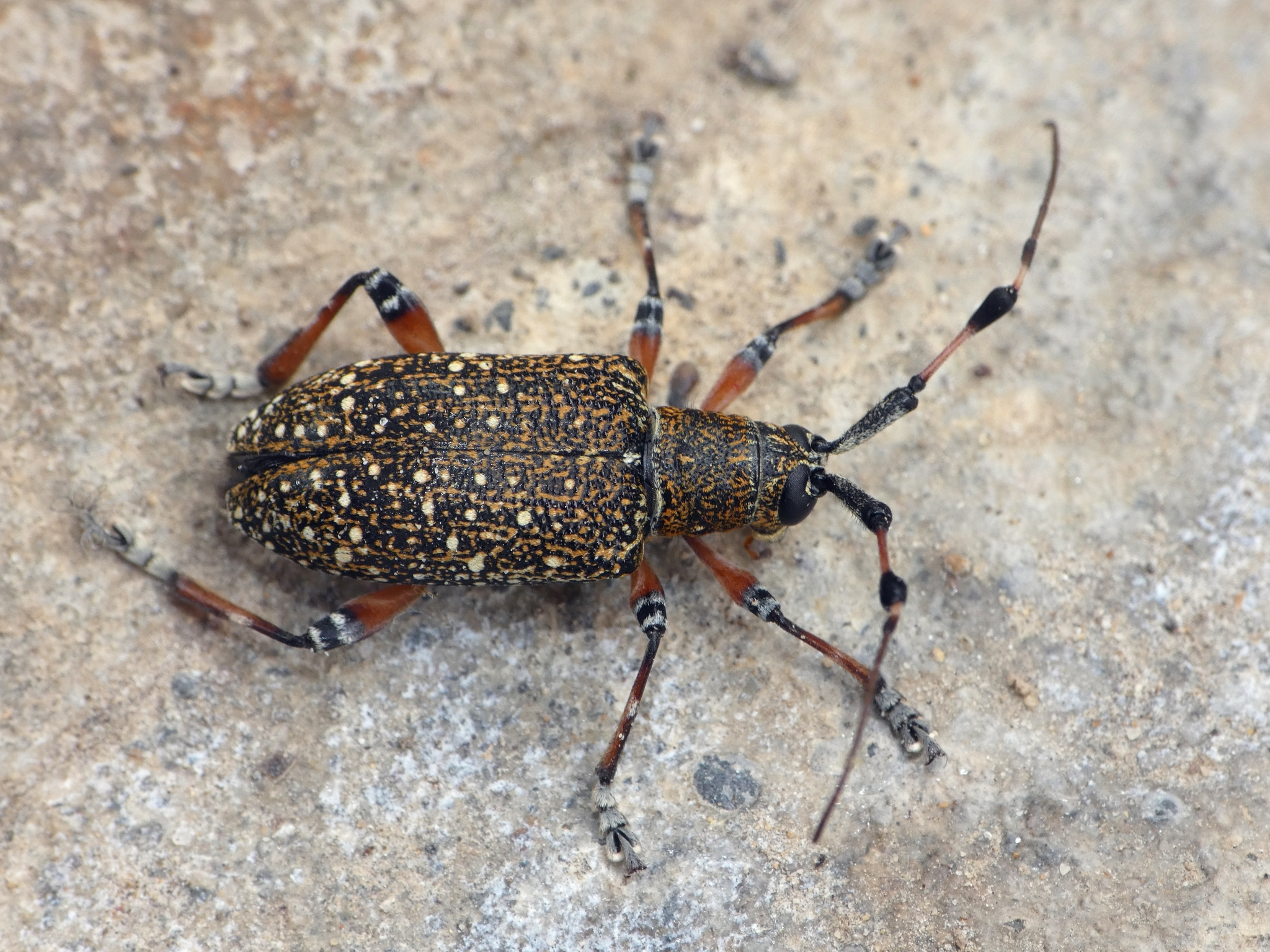
- Iphiothe pascoei

Scientific classification
- Kingdom: Animalia
- Phylum: Arthropoda
- Clade: Pancrustacea
- Class: Insecta
- Order: Coleoptera
- Suborder: Polyphaga
- Infraorder: Cucujiformia
- Family: Cerambycidae
- Tribe: Lamiini
- Genus: Iphiothe; Pascoe, 1866

Synonyms
- Mimepaphra Breuning, 1976

= Iphiothe =

Genus of beetles

Iphiothe is a genus of beetles in the family Cerambycidae. It was erected by Francis Pascoe in 1866.

== Species ==
Iphiothe contains the following species:

- Iphiothe borneana (Breuning, 1976)
- Iphiothe criopsioides Pascoe, 1866
- Iphiothe malaccensis Miroshnikov, 2019
- Iphiothe pascoei Miroshnikov & Heffern, 2020
