= Tetroreopsis =

Scientific classification
- Kingdom: Animalia
- Phylum: Arthropoda
- Class: Insecta
- Order: Coleoptera
- Suborder: Polyphaga
- Infraorder: Cucujiformia
- Family: Cerambycidae
- Genus: Tetroreopsis
- Species: T. ciliata

Binomial name
- Tetroreopsis ciliata Breuning, 1940

Genus of beetles

Tetroreopsis ciliata is a species of beetle in the family Cerambycidae, and the only species in the genus Tetroreopsis. It was described by Breuning in 1940.
