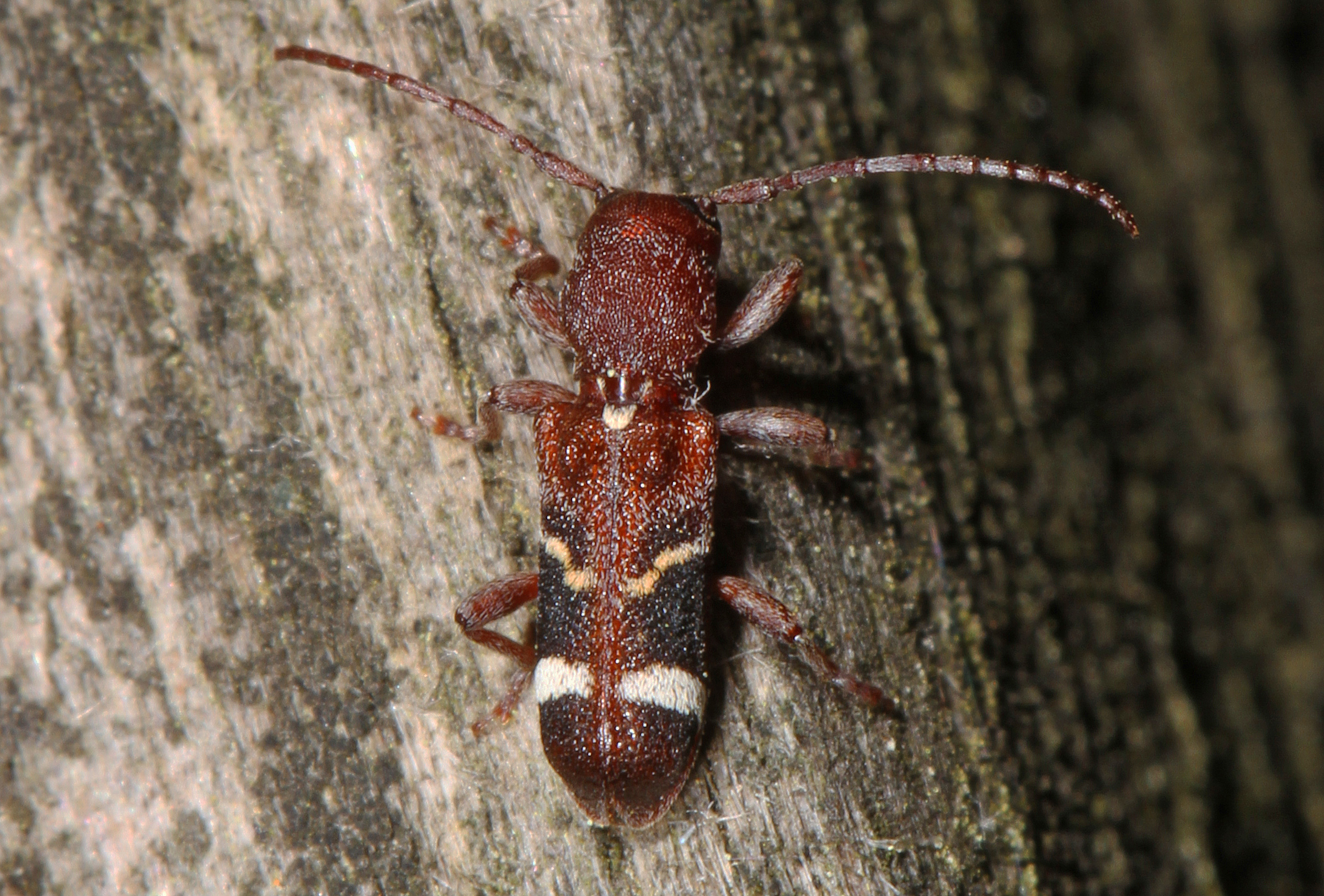

Scientific classification
- Kingdom: Animalia
- Phylum: Arthropoda
- Class: Insecta
- Order: Coleoptera
- Suborder: Polyphaga
- Infraorder: Cucujiformia
- Family: Cerambycidae
- Genus: Psenocerus
- Species: P. supernotatus

Binomial name
- Psenocerus supernotatus (Say, 1823)

= Psenocerus =

Genus of beetles

Psenocerus supernotatus is a species of beetle in the family Cerambycidae, and the only species in the genus Psenocerus. It was described by Say in 1823.
