= Striatanaesthetis =

Scientific classification
- Kingdom: Animalia
- Phylum: Arthropoda
- Class: Insecta
- Order: Coleoptera
- Suborder: Polyphaga
- Infraorder: Cucujiformia
- Family: Cerambycidae
- Genus: Striatanaesthetis
- Species: S. lineatipennis

Binomial name
- Striatanaesthetis lineatipennis Breuning, 1957

Genus of beetles

Striatanaesthetis lineatipennis is a species of beetle in the family Cerambycidae, and the only species in the genus Striatanaesthetis. It was described by Breuning in 1957.
