= Capillicornis =

Scientific classification
- Domain: Eukaryota
- Kingdom: Animalia
- Phylum: Arthropoda
- Class: Insecta
- Order: Coleoptera
- Suborder: Polyphaga
- Infraorder: Cucujiformia
- Family: Cerambycidae
- Genus: Capillicornis
- Species: C. basilaris

Binomial name
- Capillicornis basilaris Galileo & Martins, 2012

Genus of beetles

Capillicornis basilaris is a species of beetle in the family Cerambycidae, and the only species in the genus Capillicornis. It was described by Galileo and Martins in 2012. It is known from Ecuador.
