= Aragea =

Scientific classification
- Kingdom: Animalia
- Phylum: Arthropoda
- Class: Insecta
- Order: Coleoptera
- Suborder: Polyphaga
- Infraorder: Cucujiformia
- Family: Cerambycidae
- Genus: Aragea
- Species: A. mizunoi

Binomial name
- Aragea mizunoi Hayashi, 1953

Genus of beetles

Aragea mizunoi is a species of beetle in the family Cerambycidae, and the only species in the genus Aragea. It was described by Hayash in 1953.
