= Ibypeba =

Scientific classification
- Kingdom: Animalia
- Phylum: Arthropoda
- Class: Insecta
- Order: Coleoptera
- Suborder: Polyphaga
- Infraorder: Cucujiformia
- Family: Cerambycidae
- Genus: Ibypeba
- Species: I. camiri

Binomial name
- Ibypeba camiri Martins & Galileo, 2012

Genus of beetles

Ibypeba camiri is a species of beetle in the family Cerambycidae, and the only species in the genus Ibypeba. It was described by Martins and Galileo in 2012. E. camiri distribution is in the country of Bolivia.
