= Neoepaphra =

Scientific classification
- Kingdom: Animalia
- Phylum: Arthropoda
- Class: Insecta
- Order: Coleoptera
- Suborder: Polyphaga
- Infraorder: Cucujiformia
- Family: Cerambycidae
- Genus: Neoepaphra
- Species: N. pulchella

Binomial name
- Neoepaphra pulchella Fisher, 1935

Genus of beetles

Neoepaphra pulchella is a species of beetle in the family Cerambycidae, and the only species in the genus Neoepaphra. It was described by Fisher in 1935.
