= Parasalvazaon =

Scientific classification
- Kingdom: Animalia
- Phylum: Arthropoda
- Class: Insecta
- Order: Coleoptera
- Suborder: Polyphaga
- Infraorder: Cucujiformia
- Family: Cerambycidae
- Genus: Parasalvazaon
- Species: P. apicicorne

Binomial name
- Parasalvazaon apicicorne Breuning, 1958

Genus of beetles

Parasalvazaon apicicorne is a species of beetle in the family Cerambycidae, and the only species in the genus Parasalvazaon. It was described by Breuning in 1958.
