= Cicatrisestoloides =

Scientific classification
- Kingdom: Animalia
- Phylum: Arthropoda
- Class: Insecta
- Order: Coleoptera
- Suborder: Polyphaga
- Infraorder: Cucujiformia
- Family: Cerambycidae
- Genus: Cicatrisestoloides
- Species: C. costaricensis

Binomial name
- Cicatrisestoloides costaricensis Breuning & Heyrovsky, 1964

Genus of beetles

Cicatrisestoloides costaricensis is a species of beetle in the family Cerambycidae, and the only species in the genus Cicatrisestoloides. It was described by Stephan von Breuning and Heyrovsky in 1964.
