= Esaguasu =

Scientific classification
- Kingdom: Animalia
- Phylum: Arthropoda
- Class: Insecta
- Order: Coleoptera
- Suborder: Polyphaga
- Infraorder: Cucujiformia
- Family: Cerambycidae
- Genus: Esaguasu
- Species: E. ocularis

Binomial name
- Esaguasu ocularis Galileo & Martins, 2007

Genus of beetles

Esaguasu ocularis is a species of beetle in the family Cerambycidae, and the only species in the genus Esaguasu. It was described by Galileo and Martins in 2007.
