= Pseudoricopis =

Scientific classification
- Kingdom: Animalia
- Phylum: Arthropoda
- Class: Insecta
- Order: Coleoptera
- Suborder: Polyphaga
- Infraorder: Cucujiformia
- Family: Cerambycidae
- Genus: Pseudoricopis
- Species: P. excavatipennis

Binomial name
- Pseudoricopis excavatipennis Breuning, 1970

Genus of beetles

Pseudoricopis excavatipennis is a species of beetle in the family Cerambycidae, and the only species in the genus Pseudoricopis. It was described by Breuning in 1970.
