= Jolyellus =

Scientific classification
- Domain: Eukaryota
- Kingdom: Animalia
- Phylum: Arthropoda
- Class: Insecta
- Order: Coleoptera
- Suborder: Polyphaga
- Infraorder: Cucujiformia
- Family: Cerambycidae
- Genus: Jolyellus
- Species: J. albomaculatus

Binomial name
- Jolyellus albomaculatus Galileo & Martins, 2007

Genus of beetles

Jolyellus albomaculatus is a species of beetle in the family Cerambycidae, and the only species in the genus Jolyellus. It was described by Galileo and Martins in 2007.
