= Mimoscapeuseboides =

Scientific classification
- Kingdom: Animalia
- Phylum: Arthropoda
- Class: Insecta
- Order: Coleoptera
- Suborder: Polyphaga
- Infraorder: Cucujiformia
- Family: Cerambycidae
- Genus: Mimoscapeuseboides
- Species: M. pedongensis

Binomial name
- Mimoscapeuseboides pedongensis Breuning, 1976

Genus of beetles

Mimoscapeuseboides pedongensis is a species of beetle in the family Cerambycidae, and the only species in the genus Mimoscapeuseboides. It was described by Breuning in 1976.
