= Catognatha =

Scientific classification
- Kingdom: Animalia
- Phylum: Arthropoda
- Class: Insecta
- Order: Coleoptera
- Suborder: Polyphaga
- Infraorder: Cucujiformia
- Family: Cerambycidae
- Genus: Catognatha; Blanchard, 1851
- Species: C. gracilis

Binomial name
- Catognatha gracilis Blanchard, 1851

Genus of beetles

Catognatha gracilis is a species of beetle in the family Cerambycidae, and the only species in the genus Catognatha. It was described by Blanchard in 1851.
