= Gibbestoloides =

Scientific classification
- Kingdom: Animalia
- Phylum: Arthropoda
- Class: Insecta
- Order: Coleoptera
- Suborder: Polyphaga
- Infraorder: Cucujiformia
- Family: Cerambycidae
- Genus: Gibbestoloides
- Species: G. compacta

Binomial name
- Gibbestoloides compacta Breuning, 1940

Genus of beetles

Gibbestoloides compacta is a species of beetle in the family Cerambycidae, and the only species in the genus Gibbestoloides. It was described by Breuning in 1940.
