= Pseudectatosia =

Scientific classification
- Kingdom: Animalia
- Phylum: Arthropoda
- Class: Insecta
- Order: Coleoptera
- Suborder: Polyphaga
- Infraorder: Cucujiformia
- Family: Cerambycidae
- Genus: Pseudectatosia
- Species: P. strandiella

Binomial name
- Pseudectatosia strandiella Breuning, 1940

Genus of beetles

Pseudectatosia strandiella is a species of beetle in the family Cerambycidae, and the only species in the genus Pseudectatosia. It was described by Breuning in 1940.
