= Monnetyra =

Scientific classification
- Domain: Eukaryota
- Kingdom: Animalia
- Phylum: Arthropoda
- Class: Insecta
- Order: Coleoptera
- Suborder: Polyphaga
- Infraorder: Cucujiformia
- Family: Cerambycidae
- Genus: Monnetyra; Galileo & Martins, 2003
- Species: M. diabolica

Binomial name
- Monnetyra diabolica (Galileo & Martins, 2003)

Synonyms
- Anhanga Galileo & Martins, 2003

Genus of beetles

Monnetyra diabolica is a species of beetle in the family Cerambycidae, and the only species in the genus Monnetyra. It was described by Galileo and Martins in 2003.
