= Adjinga =

Scientific classification
- Kingdom: Animalia
- Phylum: Arthropoda
- Class: Insecta
- Order: Coleoptera
- Suborder: Polyphaga
- Infraorder: Cucujiformia
- Family: Cerambycidae
- Genus: Adjinga
- Species: A. vittata

Binomial name
- Adjinga vittata Pic, 1926

Genus of beetles

Adjinga is a genus of beetles in the family Cerambycidae, containing a single species, Adjinga vittata. It was described by Maurice Pic in 1926.
