= Clytosemia =

Scientific classification
- Kingdom: Animalia
- Phylum: Arthropoda
- Class: Insecta
- Order: Coleoptera
- Suborder: Polyphaga
- Infraorder: Cucujiformia
- Family: Cerambycidae
- Genus: Clytosemia
- Species: C. pulchra

Binomial name
- Clytosemia pulchra Bates, 1884

Genus of beetles

Clytosemia pulchra is a species of beetle in the family Cerambycidae, and the only species in the genus Clytosemia. It was described by Bates in 1884.
