= Falsozeargyra =

Scientific classification
- Kingdom: Animalia
- Phylum: Arthropoda
- Class: Insecta
- Order: Coleoptera
- Suborder: Polyphaga
- Infraorder: Cucujiformia
- Family: Cerambycidae
- Genus: Falsozeargyra
- Species: F. wegneri

Binomial name
- Falsozeargyra wegneri Breuning, 1963

Genus of beetles

Falsozeargyra wegneri is a species of beetle in the family Cerambycidae, and the only species in the genus Falsozeargyra. It was described by Stephan von Breuning in 1963.
