= Cristatosybra =

Scientific classification
- Kingdom: Animalia
- Phylum: Arthropoda
- Class: Insecta
- Order: Coleoptera
- Suborder: Polyphaga
- Infraorder: Cucujiformia
- Family: Cerambycidae
- Genus: Cristatosybra
- Species: C. jeanvoinei

Binomial name
- Cristatosybra jeanvoinei (Pic, 1929)

Genus of beetles

Cristatosybra jeanvoinei is a species of beetle in the family Cerambycidae, and the only species in the genus Cristatosybra. It was described by Pic in 1929.
