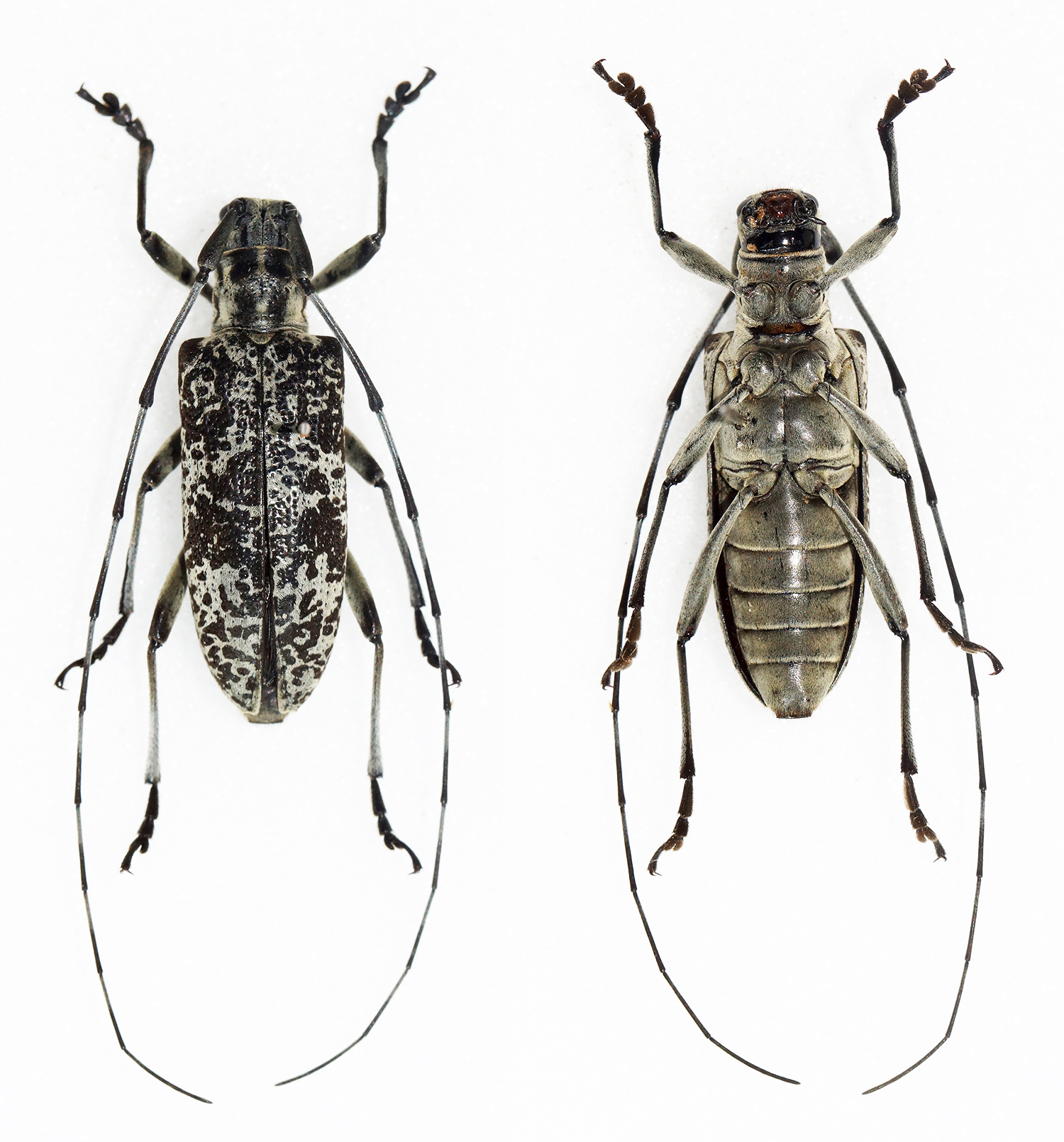

Scientific classification
- Kingdom: Animalia
- Phylum: Arthropoda
- Class: Insecta
- Order: Coleoptera
- Suborder: Polyphaga
- Infraorder: Cucujiformia
- Family: Cerambycidae
- Genus: Similonedine
- Species: S. brunniofasciata

Binomial name
- Similonedine brunniofasciata Hua, 1993

= Similonedine =

Genus of beetles

Similonedine brunniofasciata is a species of beetle in the family Cerambycidae, and the only species in the genus Similonedine. It was described by Hua in 1993 and is endemic to China (Fujian and Hunan).
