= Pseudeuseboides =

Scientific classification
- Kingdom: Animalia
- Phylum: Arthropoda
- Class: Insecta
- Order: Coleoptera
- Suborder: Polyphaga
- Infraorder: Cucujiformia
- Family: Cerambycidae
- Genus: Pseudeuseboides
- Species: P. albovittipennis

Binomial name
- Pseudeuseboides albovittipennis (Breuning, 1968)

Synonyms
- Mimeuseboides albovittipennis Breuning, 1968

Genus of beetles

Pseudeuseboides albovittipennis is a species of beetle in the family Cerambycidae, and the only species in the genus Pseudeuseboides. It was described by Breuning in 1968.
