= Piruauna =

Scientific classification
- Domain: Eukaryota
- Kingdom: Animalia
- Phylum: Arthropoda
- Class: Insecta
- Order: Coleoptera
- Suborder: Polyphaga
- Infraorder: Cucujiformia
- Family: Cerambycidae
- Genus: Piruauna
- Species: P. tuberosa

Binomial name
- Piruauna tuberosa Galileo & Martins, 1998

Genus of beetles

Piruauna tuberosa is a species of beetle in the family Cerambycidae, and the only species in the genus Piruauna. It was described by Galileo and Martins in 1998.
