= Trichosophroniella =

Scientific classification
- Kingdom: Animalia
- Phylum: Arthropoda
- Class: Insecta
- Order: Coleoptera
- Suborder: Polyphaga
- Infraorder: Cucujiformia
- Family: Cerambycidae
- Genus: Trichosophroniella
- Species: T. rotschildi

Binomial name
- Trichosophroniella rotschildi Breuning, 1959

Genus of beetles

Trichosophroniella rotschildi is a species of beetle in the family Cerambycidae, and the only species in the genus Trichosophroniella. It was described by Breuning in 1959.
