= Cotyschnolea =

Scientific classification
- Kingdom: Animalia
- Phylum: Arthropoda
- Class: Insecta
- Order: Coleoptera
- Suborder: Polyphaga
- Infraorder: Cucujiformia
- Family: Cerambycidae
- Genus: Cotyschnolea
- Species: C. minuta

Binomial name
- Cotyschnolea minuta Martins & Galileo, 2006

Genus of beetles

Cotyschnolea minuta is a species of beetle in the family Cerambycidae, and the only species in the genus Cotyschnolea. It was described by Martins and Galileo in 2006.
