= Probatodes =

Scientific classification
- Kingdom: Animalia
- Phylum: Arthropoda
- Class: Insecta
- Order: Coleoptera
- Suborder: Polyphaga
- Infraorder: Cucujiformia
- Family: Cerambycidae
- Genus: Probatodes
- Species: P. plumula

Binomial name
- Probatodes plumula (Newman, 1851)

Genus of beetles

Probatodes plumula is a species of beetle in the family Cerambycidae, and the only species in the genus Probatodes. It was described by Newman in 1851.
