= Trichostenidea =

Scientific classification
- Kingdom: Animalia
- Phylum: Arthropoda
- Class: Insecta
- Order: Coleoptera
- Suborder: Polyphaga
- Infraorder: Cucujiformia
- Family: Cerambycidae
- Genus: Trichostenidea
- Species: T. rufopunctata

Binomial name
- Trichostenidea rufopunctata Breuning, 1948

Genus of beetles

Trichostenidea rufopunctata is a species of beetle in the family Cerambycidae, and the only species in the genus Trichostenidea. It was described by Breuning in 1948.
