= Diliolophus =

Scientific classification
- Kingdom: Animalia
- Phylum: Arthropoda
- Class: Insecta
- Order: Coleoptera
- Suborder: Polyphaga
- Infraorder: Cucujiformia
- Family: Cerambycidae
- Genus: Diliolophus
- Species: D. vexator

Binomial name
- Diliolophus vexator Bates, 1885

Genus of beetles

Diliolophus vexator is a species of beetle in the family Cerambycidae, and the only species in the genus Diliolophus. It was described by Henry Walter Bates in 1885.
