= Baraeomimus =

Scientific classification
- Kingdom: Animalia
- Phylum: Arthropoda
- Class: Insecta
- Order: Coleoptera
- Suborder: Polyphaga
- Infraorder: Cucujiformia
- Family: Cerambycidae
- Genus: Baraeomimus
- Species: B. usambaricus

Binomial name
- Baraeomimus usambaricus Breuning, 1973

Genus of beetles

Baraeomimus is a genus of beetles in the family Cerambycidae, containing a single species, Baraeomimus usambaricus. It was described by Breuning in 1973. The beetle is native to Tanzania.
