= Paraphronastes =

Scientific classification
- Kingdom: Animalia
- Phylum: Arthropoda
- Class: Insecta
- Order: Coleoptera
- Suborder: Polyphaga
- Infraorder: Cucujiformia
- Family: Cerambycidae
- Genus: Paraphronastes
- Species: P. biocellatus

Binomial name
- Paraphronastes biocellatus Breuning, 1980

Genus of beetles

Paraphronastes biocellatus is a species of beetle in the family Cerambycidae, and the only species in the genus Paraphronastes. It was described by Breuning in 1980.
