= Veloropsis =

Scientific classification
- Kingdom: Animalia
- Phylum: Arthropoda
- Class: Insecta
- Order: Coleoptera
- Suborder: Polyphaga
- Infraorder: Cucujiformia
- Family: Cerambycidae
- Genus: Veloropsis
- Species: V. rufoflava

Binomial name
- Veloropsis rufoflava Breuning, 1969

Genus of beetles

Veloropsis rufoflava is a species of beetle in the family Cerambycidae, and the only species in the genus Veloropsis. It was described by Breuning in 1969.
