= Cristorhodopina =

Scientific classification
- Kingdom: Animalia
- Phylum: Arthropoda
- Class: Insecta
- Order: Coleoptera
- Suborder: Polyphaga
- Infraorder: Cucujiformia
- Family: Cerambycidae
- Genus: Cristorhodopina
- Species: C. mussardi

Binomial name
- Cristorhodopina mussardi Breuning, 1966

Genus of beetles

Cristorhodopina mussardi is a species of beetle in the family Cerambycidae, and the only species in the genus Cristorhodopina. It was described by Stephan von Breuning in 1966.
