= Pseudorhodopis =

Scientific classification
- Kingdom: Animalia
- Phylum: Arthropoda
- Class: Insecta
- Order: Coleoptera
- Suborder: Polyphaga
- Infraorder: Cucujiformia
- Family: Cerambycidae
- Genus: Pseudorhodopis
- Species: P. inermis

Binomial name
- Pseudorhodopis inermis Breuning, 1940

Genus of beetles

Pseudorhodopis inermis is a species of beetle in the family Cerambycidae, and the only species in the genus Pseudorhodopis. It was described by Stephan von Breuning in 1940.
