= Diadelia fuscostictica =

Scientific classification
- Kingdom: Animalia
- Phylum: Arthropoda
- Class: Insecta
- Order: Coleoptera
- Suborder: Polyphaga
- Infraorder: Cucujiformia
- Family: Cerambycidae
- Genus: Diadelia
- Subgenus: Myodiadelia
- Species: D. fuscostictica

Binomial name
- Diadelia fuscostictica Baguena Corella & Breuning, 1958

Species of beetle

Diadelia fuscostictica is a species of beetle in the family Cerambycidae. It was described by Baguena Corella and Breuning in 1958.
