= Diadelia truncata =

Scientific classification
- Domain: Eukaryota
- Kingdom: Animalia
- Phylum: Arthropoda
- Class: Insecta
- Order: Coleoptera
- Suborder: Polyphaga
- Infraorder: Cucujiformia
- Family: Cerambycidae
- Genus: Diadelia
- Subgenus: Diadelia
- Species: D. truncata

Binomial name
- Diadelia truncata (Aurivillius, 1915)

Synonyms
- Paradera truncata Aurivillius, 1915

Species of beetle

Diadelia truncata is a species of beetle in the family Cerambycidae. It was described by Per Olof Christopher Aurivillius in 1915.
