= Diadelia nervosa =

Scientific classification
- Kingdom: Animalia
- Phylum: Arthropoda
- Class: Insecta
- Order: Coleoptera
- Suborder: Polyphaga
- Infraorder: Cucujiformia
- Family: Cerambycidae
- Genus: Diadelia
- Subgenus: Diadelia
- Species: D. nervosa

Binomial name
- Diadelia nervosa Fairmaire, 1871

Species of beetle

Diadelia nervosa is a species of beetle in the family Cerambycidae. It was described by Fairmaire in 1871.
