= Diadelia apicalis =

Scientific classification
- Domain: Eukaryota
- Kingdom: Animalia
- Phylum: Arthropoda
- Class: Insecta
- Order: Coleoptera
- Suborder: Polyphaga
- Infraorder: Cucujiformia
- Family: Cerambycidae
- Genus: Diadelia
- Subgenus: Diadelia
- Species: D. apicalis

Binomial name
- Diadelia apicalis (Gahan, 1890)

Species of beetle

Diadelia apicalis is a species of beetle in the family Cerambycidae. It was described by Gahan in 1890.
