= Diadelia viossati =

Scientific classification
- Kingdom: Animalia
- Phylum: Arthropoda
- Class: Insecta
- Order: Coleoptera
- Suborder: Polyphaga
- Infraorder: Cucujiformia
- Family: Cerambycidae
- Genus: Diadelia
- Subgenus: Diadelia
- Species: D. viossati

Binomial name
- Diadelia viossati Breuning, 1970

Species of beetle

Diadelia viossati is a species of beetle in the family Cerambycidae. It was described by Breuning in 1970.
