= Diadelia x-fasciata =

Scientific classification
- Domain: Eukaryota
- Kingdom: Animalia
- Phylum: Arthropoda
- Class: Insecta
- Order: Coleoptera
- Suborder: Polyphaga
- Infraorder: Cucujiformia
- Family: Cerambycidae
- Genus: Diadelia
- Subgenus: Diadelia
- Species: D. x-fasciata

Binomial name
- Diadelia x-fasciata Gahan, 1890

Species of beetle

Diadelia x-fasciata is a species of beetle in the family Cerambycidae. It was described by Gahan in 1890. It is known from Madagascar.
