= Diadelia albosquamulosa =

Scientific classification
- Kingdom: Animalia
- Phylum: Arthropoda
- Class: Insecta
- Order: Coleoptera
- Suborder: Polyphaga
- Infraorder: Cucujiformia
- Family: Cerambycidae
- Genus: Diadelia
- Subgenus: Anadiadelia
- Species: D. albosquamulosa

Binomial name
- Diadelia albosquamulosa Breuning, 1949

Synonyms
- Diadelia squamulosa (Breuning) Téocchi, 1992

Species of beetle

Diadelia albosquamulosa is a species of beetle in the family Cerambycidae. It was described by Breuning in 1949.
