= Diadelia congoana =

Scientific classification
- Kingdom: Animalia
- Phylum: Arthropoda
- Class: Insecta
- Order: Coleoptera
- Suborder: Polyphaga
- Infraorder: Cucujiformia
- Family: Cerambycidae
- Genus: Diadelia
- Subgenus: Congodiadelia
- Species: D. congoana

Binomial name
- Diadelia congoana Breuning, 1943

Species of beetle

Diadelia congoana is a species of beetle in the family Cerambycidae. It was described by Breuning in 1943.
