= Diadelia albovittata =

Scientific classification
- Kingdom: Animalia
- Phylum: Arthropoda
- Class: Insecta
- Order: Coleoptera
- Suborder: Polyphaga
- Infraorder: Cucujiformia
- Family: Cerambycidae
- Genus: Diadelia
- Subgenus: Diadelia
- Species: D. albovittata

Binomial name
- Diadelia albovittata Breuning, 1957

Species of beetle

Diadelia albovittata is a species of beetle in the family Cerambycidae. It was described by Breuning in 1957.
