= Diadelia laterimaculata =

Scientific classification
- Kingdom: Animalia
- Phylum: Arthropoda
- Class: Insecta
- Order: Coleoptera
- Suborder: Polyphaga
- Infraorder: Cucujiformia
- Family: Cerambycidae
- Genus: Diadelia
- Subgenus: Setodiadelia
- Species: D. laterimaculata

Binomial name
- Diadelia laterimaculata Breuning, 1943

Species of beetle

Diadelia laterimaculata is a species of beetle in the family Cerambycidae. It was described by the entomologist Stephan von Breuning in 1943.
