= Diadelia x-flava =

Scientific classification
- Kingdom: Animalia
- Phylum: Arthropoda
- Class: Insecta
- Order: Coleoptera
- Suborder: Polyphaga
- Infraorder: Cucujiformia
- Family: Cerambycidae
- Genus: Diadelia
- Subgenus: Diadelia
- Species: D. x-flava

Binomial name
- Diadelia x-flava Breuning, 1971

Species of beetle

Diadelia x-flava is a species of beetle in the family Cerambycidae. It was described by Breuning in 1971. It is known from Madagascar.
