= Diadelia nervulata =

Scientific classification
- Kingdom: Animalia
- Phylum: Arthropoda
- Class: Insecta
- Order: Coleoptera
- Suborder: Polyphaga
- Infraorder: Cucujiformia
- Family: Cerambycidae
- Genus: Diadelia
- Subgenus: Diadelia
- Species: D. nervulata

Binomial name
- Diadelia nervulata Fairmaire, 1903

Species of beetle

Diadelia nervulata is a species of beetle in the family Cerambycidae. It was described by Fairmaire in 1903.

== Subspecies ==
- Diadelia nervulata nervulata Fairmaire, 1903
- Diadelia nervulata propinqua Breuning, 1940
