= Diadelia biplagiata =

Scientific classification
- Domain: Eukaryota
- Kingdom: Animalia
- Phylum: Arthropoda
- Class: Insecta
- Order: Coleoptera
- Suborder: Polyphaga
- Infraorder: Cucujiformia
- Family: Cerambycidae
- Genus: Diadelia
- Subgenus: Diadelia
- Species: D. biplagiata

Binomial name
- Diadelia biplagiata Waterhouse, 1882

Species of beetle

Diadelia biplagiata is a species of beetle in the family Cerambycidae. It was described by Waterhouse in 1882.
