= Diadelia =

Scientific classification
- Domain: Eukaryota
- Kingdom: Animalia
- Phylum: Arthropoda
- Class: Insecta
- Order: Coleoptera
- Suborder: Polyphaga
- Infraorder: Cucujiformia
- Family: Cerambycidae
- Subfamily: Lamiinae
- Tribe: Desmiphorini
- Genus: Diadelia; Waterhouse, 1882

Genus of beetles

Diadelia is a genus of longhorn beetles of the subfamily Lamiinae, containing the following species:

subgenus Adiadelia

- Diadelia inermicollis Breuning, 1939
- Diadelia nitidipennis Breuning, 1966

subgenus Anadiadelia

- Diadelia albosquamulosa Breuning, 1949

subgenus Congodiadelia

- Diadelia congoana Breuning, 1943

subgenus Diadelia

- Diadelia affinis Breuning, 1939
- Diadelia albomaculatoides Breuning, 1961
- Diadelia albomarmorata Breuning, 1965
- Diadelia albovittata Breuning, 1957
- Diadelia antegrisea Breuning, 1957
- Diadelia apicalis (Gahan, 1890)
- Diadelia apicefusca Breuning, 1970
- Diadelia atomosparsa Fairmaire, 1904
- Diadelia basifusca Breuning, 1940
- Diadelia basifuscipennis Breuning, 1957
- Diadelia basifuscomaculata Breuning, 1980
- Diadelia betschi Breuning, 1975
- Diadelia bicoloricornis Breuning, 1961
- Diadelia biplagiata Waterhouse, 1882
- Diadelia bispina (Fairmaire, 1904)
- Diadelia bispinipennis Breuning, 1961
- Diadelia bispinosa Breuning, 1939
- Diadelia blanci Breuning, 1975
- Diadelia brunneofasciata Breuning, 1943
- Diadelia cinerascens Fairmaire, 1896
- Diadelia convexicollis (Fairmaire, 1899)
- Diadelia costipennis Fairmaire, 1896
- Diadelia densemarmorata Breuning, 1964
- Diadelia dujardini Breuning, 1970
- Diadelia excavatipennis Breuning, 1965
- Diadelia flavicollis Breuning, 1957
- Diadelia flavovitticollis Breuning, 1966
- Diadelia flavovittipennis Breuning, 1957
- Diadelia geminatoides Breuning, 1961
- Diadelia granulipennis Breuning, 1957
- Diadelia granulithorax Breuning, 1957
- Diadelia grisea Breuning, 1969
- Diadelia griseata Breuning, 1957
- Diadelia griseola Breuning, 1939
- Diadelia grisescens Breuning, 1939
- Diadelia imitatrix Breuning, 1939
- Diadelia iners Fairmaire, 1902
- Diadelia infasciata Breuning, 1957
- Diadelia inornata (Fairmaire, 1905)
- Diadelia interrupta (Fairmaire, 1896)
- Diadelia lateriplagiata Breuning, 1939
- Diadelia lebisi Breuning, 1957
- Diadelia leucovittata Breuning, 1970
- Diadelia lignea Breuning, 1940
- Diadelia ligneoides Breuning, 1961
- Diadelia lineata Breuning, 1943
- Diadelia lineigera (Fairmaire, 1899)
- Diadelia lineolata Breuning, 1939
- Diadelia marmorata Breuning, 1939
- Diadelia marmoratoides Breuning, 1975
- Diadelia nervosa Fairmaire, 1871
- Diadelia nervulata Fairmaire, 1903
- Diadelia nigropunctata Breuning, 1980
- Diadelia obenbergeri Breuning, 1943
- Diadelia oberthuri Breuning, 1957
- Diadelia obliquata Breuning, 1948
- Diadelia obliquefasciata Breuning, 1965
- Diadelia obliquenigrovittata Breuning, 1980
- Diadelia obliquepicta (Fairmaire, 1899)
- Diadelia obliquevittata Breuning, 1961
- Diadelia ochreovittata Breuning, 1970
- Diadelia paracostipennis Breuning, 1970
- Diadelia parapunctifrons Breuning, 1977
- Diadelia parobliquata Breuning, 1975
- Diadelia parvula Breuning, 1939
- Diadelia postalbomaculata Breuning, 1957
- Diadelia puncticollis Breuning, 1940
- Diadelia punctifrons Breuning, 1940
- Diadelia ratovosoni Breuning, 1970
- Diadelia rotundipennis Breuning, 1966
- Diadelia rugicollis Breuning, 1980
- Diadelia strandiella Breuning, 1940
- Diadelia sublinea Breuning, 1970
- Diadelia subnervulata Breuning, 1957
- Diadelia subornata Breuning, 1957
- Diadelia subuniformis Breuning, 1961
- Diadelia transversefasciata Breuning, 1964
- Diadelia truncata (Aurivillius, 1915)
- Diadelia unicolor Breuning, 1970
- Diadelia vadoni Breuning, 1957
- Diadelia vadoniana Breuning, 1957
- Diadelia vagefasciata Fairmaire, 1902
- Diadelia vicina Breuning, 1961
- Diadelia viossati Breuning, 1970
- Diadelia vittipennis Breuning, 1957
- Diadelia x-brunnea Breuning, 1939
- Diadelia x-fasciata Gahan, 1890
- Diadelia x-fascioides Breuning, 1971
- Diadelia x-flava Breuning, 1971
- Diadelia x-fusca Breuning, 1965
- Diadelia x-fuscoides Breuning, 1980
- Diadelia xylina Breuning, 1961

subgenus Guineodiadelia

- Diadelia gabonica Breuning, 1940
- Diadelia guineensis Baguena Corella & Breuning, 1958

subgenus Myodiadelia

- Diadelia albosetosa Breuning, 1953
- Diadelia fuscostictica Baguena Corella & Breuning, 1958
- Diadelia laeviceps Breuning, 1942
- Diadelia longicornis Breuning, 1949
- Diadelia minuscula Breuning, 1940
- Diadelia retrospinosa Breuning, 1961
- Diadelia spinipennis Breuning, 1961
- Diadelia squamulosa Breuning, 1940

subgenus Setodiadelia

- Diadelia holobrunnea Breuning, 1980
- Diadelia laterimaculata Breuning, 1943
- Diadelia setigera Breuning, 1957
- Diadelia setigeroides Breuning, 1980
