= Diadelia setigeroides =

Scientific classification
- Kingdom: Animalia
- Phylum: Arthropoda
- Class: Insecta
- Order: Coleoptera
- Suborder: Polyphaga
- Infraorder: Cucujiformia
- Family: Cerambycidae
- Genus: Diadelia
- Subgenus: Setodiadelia
- Species: D. setigeroides

Binomial name
- Diadelia setigeroides Breuning, 1980

Species of beetle

Diadelia setigeroides is a species of beetle in the family Cerambycidae. It was described by Breuning in 1980.
