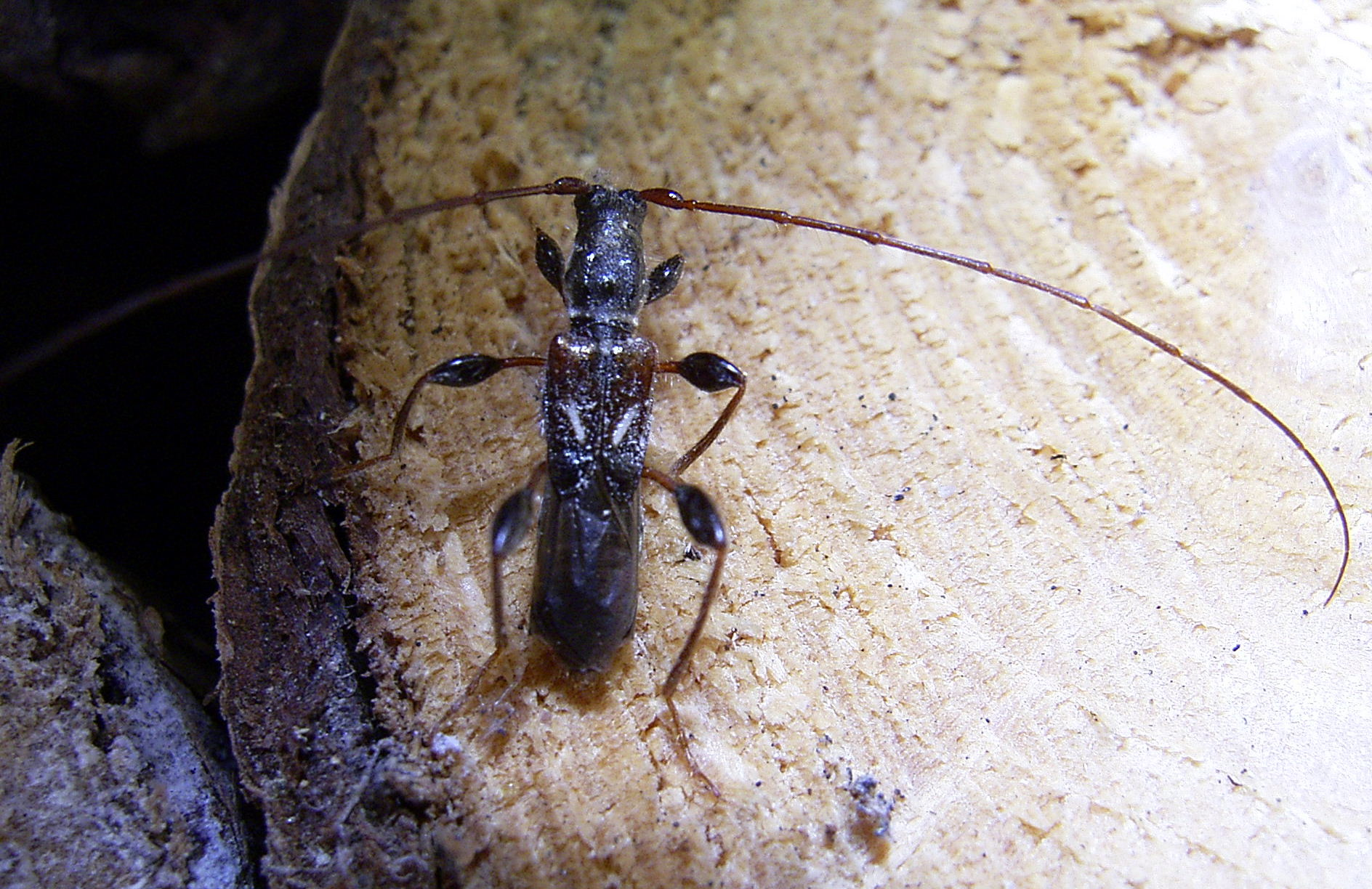
- Molorchus minor

Scientific classification
- Domain: Eukaryota
- Kingdom: Animalia
- Phylum: Arthropoda
- Class: Insecta
- Order: Coleoptera
- Suborder: Polyphaga
- Infraorder: Cucujiformia
- Family: Cerambycidae
- Subfamily: Cerambycinae
- Tribe: Molorchini; Mulsant, 1863

= Molorchini =

Tribe of beetles

Molorchini is a tribe of beetles in the subfamily Cerambycinae, containing the following genera:

- Genus Afromolorchus Tippmann, 1959
- Genus Anencyrus Sharp, 1886
  - Anencyrus discedens Sharp, 1886
- Genus Anomoderus Fairmaire, 1871
- Genus Berndgerdia Holzschuh, 1982
- Genus Brachaciptera Lea, 1917
- Genus Buddhapania Niisato, 2015
- Genus Epania Pascoe, 1858
- Genus Gastrosarus Bates, 1874
  - Gastrosarus lautus Broun, 1893
  - Gastrosarus nigricollis Bates, 1874
  - Gastrosarus picticornis Broun, 1893
  - Gastrosarus urbanus Broun, 1893
- Genus Laopania Holzschuh, 2010
- Genus Leptepania Heller, 1924
- Genus Malayanomolorchus Hayashi, 1979
- Genus Mecynopus Erichson, 1842
- Genus Merionoedina Villiers, 1968
- Genus Merionoedopsis Gounelle, 1911
  - Merionoedopsis aeneiventris Gounelle, 1911
  - Merionoedopsis brevipennis Melzer, 1934
- Genus Molochrus Heller, 1924
- Genus Molorchoepania Pic, 1949
- Genus Molorchus Fabricius, 1793
  Selected species:
  - Molorchus bimaculatus Say, 1824
  - Molorchus eburneus Linsley, 1931
  - Molorchus longicollis LeConte, 1873
  - Molorchus umbellatarum (Schreber, 1759)
- Genus Nadezhdiana Cherepanov, 1976
- Genus Nephithea Pascoe, 1867
- Genus Paranomoderus Breuning, 1954
- Genus Tsujius Ikeda, 2001
