= Dysthaeta naevia =

Scientific classification
- Kingdom: Animalia
- Phylum: Arthropoda
- Class: Insecta
- Order: Coleoptera
- Suborder: Polyphaga
- Infraorder: Cucujiformia
- Family: Cerambycidae
- Tribe: Epicastini
- Genus: Dysthaeta
- Species: D. naevia

Binomial name
- Dysthaeta naevia Olliff, 1888

Species of beetle

Dysthaeta naevia is a species of beetle in the family Cerambycidae. It was described by Olliff in 1888. It is known from Norfolk Island.

== Description ==
Dysthaeta naevia adults are 15-17 mm in length and moderately convex in shape. Overall, they are dark in colour with pubescence on the head, antennae, prothorax, scutellum, underside and legs.

The head has a strongly marked median line. The antennae are about as long as the body, dark, and with grey pubescence on segments 3-11.

The prothorax is transverse in shape, and has a pair of tubercles laterally and a second pair dorsally. The scutellum is rounded posteriorly. The tibiae of the legs are dark basally.

The elytra at their bases are much wider than the prothorax, but become narrower posteriorly. Each elytron has a conspicuous tubercle in the middle near the base (distinguishing it from the related D. anomala). The basal halves of the elytra are coarsely and sparsely punctured, becoming almost impunctate posteriorly.
