= Epania cingalensis =

Scientific classification
- Kingdom: Animalia
- Phylum: Arthropoda
- Class: Insecta
- Order: Coleoptera
- Suborder: Polyphaga
- Infraorder: Cucujiformia
- Family: Cerambycidae
- Subfamily: Cerambycinae
- Tribe: Molorchini
- Genus: Epania
- Species: E. cingalensis

Binomial name
- Epania cingalensis Gardner, 1936

Species of beetle

Epania cingalensis is a species of Longhorn beetle endemic to Sri Lanka.
