= Dysthaeta =

Scientific classification
- Kingdom: Animalia
- Phylum: Arthropoda
- Class: Insecta
- Order: Coleoptera
- Suborder: Polyphaga
- Infraorder: Cucujiformia
- Family: Cerambycidae
- Tribe: Epicastini
- Genus: Dysthaeta

Genus of beetles

Dysthaeta is a genus of longhorn beetles of the subfamily Lamiinae, containing the following species:

- Dysthaeta anomala Pascoe, 1859
- Dysthaeta incerta Breuning, 1939
- Dysthaeta naevia Olliff, 1888
