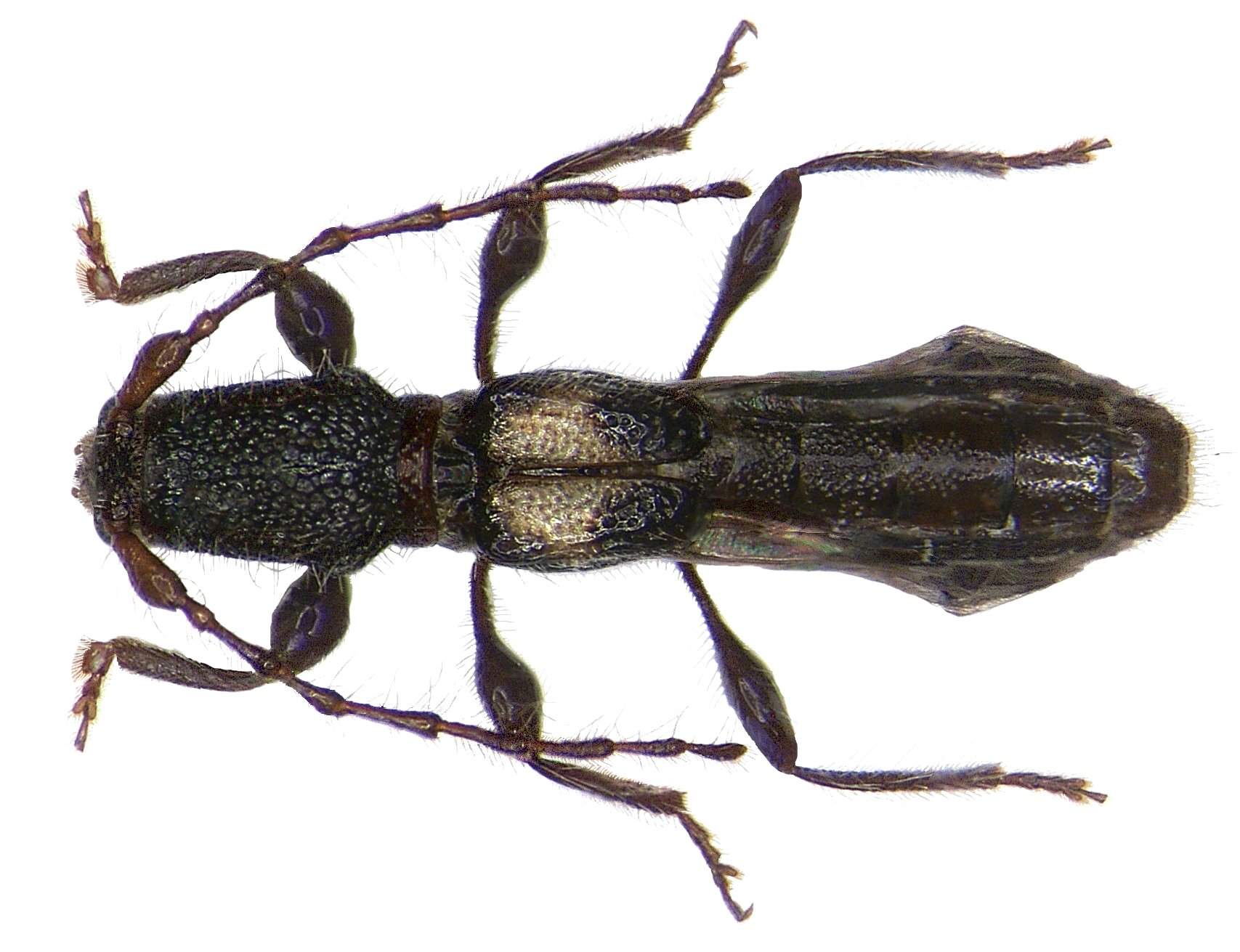
- Leptepania sulcicollis, Gressit 1951

Scientific classification
- Kingdom: Animalia
- Phylum: Arthropoda
- Clade: Pancrustacea
- Class: Insecta
- Order: Coleoptera
- Suborder: Polyphaga
- Infraorder: Cucujiformia
- Family: Cerambycidae
- Subfamily: Cerambycinae
- Tribe: Molorchini
- Genus: Leptepania; Heller, 1924

= Leptepania =

Genus of beetles

Leptepania is a genus of beetles found throughout Asia, including in India, Taiwan, and Japan.

== Description ==
Beetles of this genus possess a short head, the front of which is transverse and slightly convex. The eyes have a small lower lobe that is completely separated from the tiny upper lobe. The antennae are short, not reaching the apex of the abdomen. The prothorax is elongated and widest before the constricted base. Males have a large pubescent cavity on each side of the abdomen while females have a shallow hollow without pubescence. The elytra do not extend beyond the hind coxae. The first leg segment of males expand inwardly into a flat, axe-shaped structure.

== Taxonomy ==
Leptepania contains the following species:

- Leptepania minuta
- Leptepania japonica
- Leptepania lantauensis
- Leptepania indica
