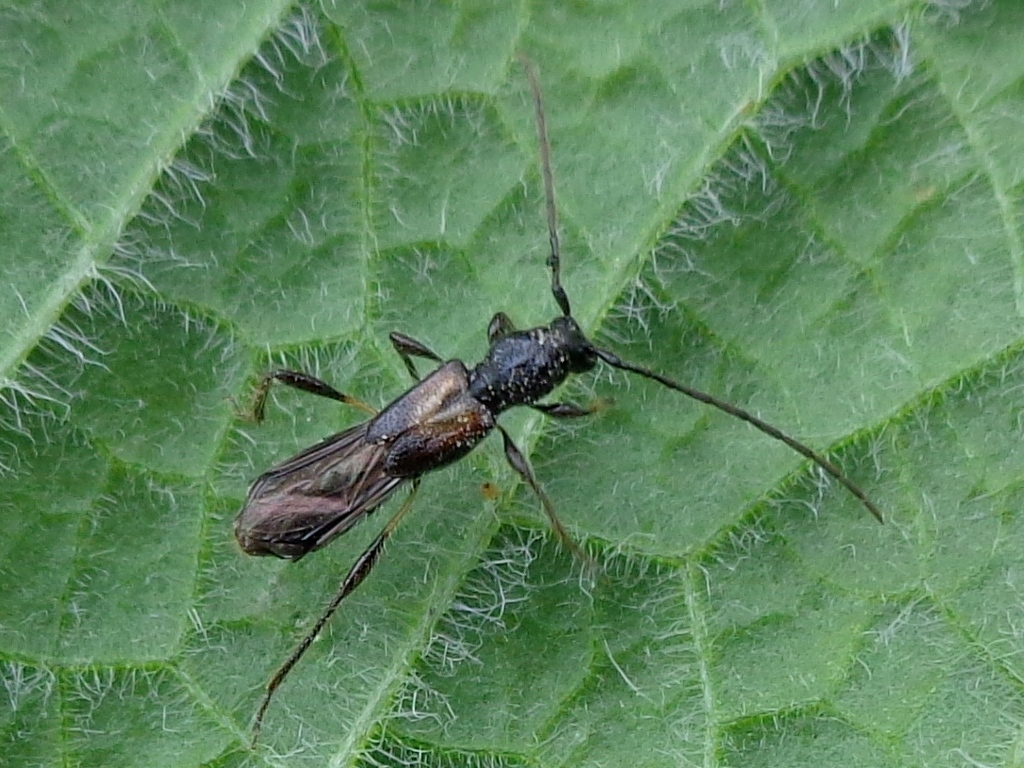
- Molorchus umbellatarum

Scientific classification
- Kingdom: Animalia
- Phylum: Arthropoda
- Clade: Pancrustacea
- Class: Insecta
- Order: Coleoptera
- Suborder: Polyphaga
- Infraorder: Cucujiformia
- Family: Cerambycidae
- Subfamily: Cerambycinae
- Tribe: Molorchini
- Genus: Molorchus; Fabricius, 1793

Synonyms
- Glaphyra Newman, 1840; Heliomanes Newman, 1840 nec Sodovsky, 1837; Laphyra Newman, 1842 nec Billberg, 1820

= Molorchus =

Genus of beetles

Molorchus is a genus of longhorn beetles in the tribe Molorchini.

== Subgenera and species ==
BioLib includes:

subgenus Caenoptera Thomson, 1859

1. Molorchus abieticola Holzschuh, 2007
2. Molorchus asperanus Holzschuh, 1989
3. Molorchus aureomaculatus Gressitt & Rondon, 1970
4. Molorchus carus Holzschuh, 1999
5. Molorchus changi Gressitt, 1951
6. Molorchus eburneus Linsley, 1931
7. Molorchus foveolus Holzschuh, 1998
8. Molorchus ikedai Takakuwa, 1984
9. Molorchus juglandis Sama, 1982
10. Molorchus minor (Linnaeus, 1758)
11. Molorchus monticola Plavilstshikov, 1931
12. Molorchus pallidipennis Heyden, 1887
13. Molorchus pinivorus Takakuwa & Ikeda, 1979
14. Molorchus relictus Niisato, 1996

subgenus Epanioglaphyra Niisato, 1986

1. Molorchus kurosawai (Niisato, 1986)

subgenus Molorchus Fabricius, 1793

1. Molorchus adachii Takakuwa & Fujita, 1981
2. Molorchus angularis (Holzschuh, 2006)
3. Molorchus approximans (Holzschuh, 2007)
4. Molorchus bassettii (Sama, 1992)
5. Molorchus bimaculatus Say, 1824
6. Molorchus chalybeellus (Holzschuh, 2007)
7. Molorchus cobaltinus Hayashi, 1963
8. Molorchus cyanescens Gressitt, 1951
9. Molorchus fraudulentus (Holzschuh, 2006)
10. Molorchus gilvitarsis (Holzschuh, 2006)
11. Molorchus gracilis Hayashi, 1949
12. Molorchus horaki (Holzschuh, 1992)
13. Molorchus ishiharai Ohbayashi, 1936
14. Molorchus ivorensis (Adlbauer, 2004)
15. Molorchus jiuyetanus (Hayashi, 1984)
16. Molorchus kiesenwetteri Mulsant & Rey, 1861
17. Molorchus kiyoymai Hayashi, 1974
18. Molorchus kobotokensis Ohbayashi, 1963
19. Molorchus kojimai (Matsushita, 1939)
20. Molorchus laetus Holzschuh, 2003
21. Molorchus lampros (Holzschuh, 2006)
22. Molorchus lectus (Holzschuh, 2006)
23. Molorchus liui Gressitt, 1948
24. Molorchus liukueiensis (Hayashi, 1984)
25. Molorchus longicollis LeConte, 1873
26. Molorchus luzonicus Vives, 2015
27. Molorchus malmusii (Sama, 1994)
28. Molorchus marmottani Brisout de Barneville, 1863
29. Molorchus molorchoides (Holzschuh, 1984)
30. Molorchus moraveci (Holzschuh, 2006)
31. Molorchus morii Makihara, 1983
32. Molorchus nitidus Obika, 1973
33. Molorchus nobilitatus (Holzschuh, 2007)
34. Molorchus plagiatus Reiche, 1877
35. Molorchus plavilstshikovi Gressitt, 1951
36. Molorchus principatus (Holzschuh, 2007)
37. Molorchus schmidti Ganglbauer, 1883
38. Molorchus serrus (Holzschuh, 2006)
39. Molorchus shibatai Hayashi, 1961
40. Molorchus shimai Hayashi & Makihara, 1981
41. Molorchus sidus (Newman, 1840)
42. Molorchus sikkimanus Holzschuh, 2003
43. Molorchus starki Shabliovsky, 1936
44. Molorchus sterbai Adlabuer, 1988
45. Molorchus strangulatus (Holzschuh, 2007)
46. Molorchus takeuchii (Ohbayashi, 1937)
47. Molorchus taprobanicus Gahan, 1906
48. Molorchus tenuitarsis Holzschuh, 1981
49. Molorchus tjanschanicus Plavilstshikov, 1959
50. Molorchus umbellatarum (Schreber, 1759) - type species
51. Molorchus verus (Holzschuh, 2007)
52. Molorchus viridicollis Heller, 1924
53. Molorchus watani (Kano, 1933)
54. Molorchus yui Hayashi, 1984

subgenus Nathrioglaphyra Sama, 1995

1. Molorchus alashanicus Semenov & Plavilstshikov, 1936
2. Molorchus heptapotamicus Plavilstshikov, 1940

subgenus Yamatoglaphyra Niisato, 2006

1. Molorchus hattorii Ohbayashi, 1953
