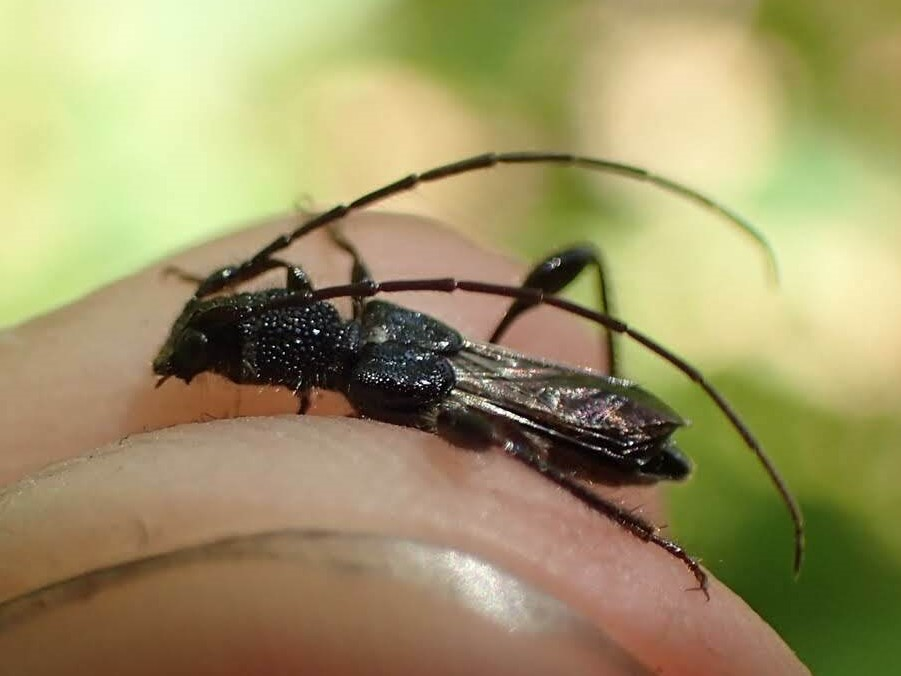
- Epania septemtrionalis

Scientific classification
- Domain: Eukaryota
- Kingdom: Animalia
- Phylum: Arthropoda
- Class: Insecta
- Order: Coleoptera
- Suborder: Polyphaga
- Infraorder: Cucujiformia
- Family: Cerambycidae
- Subfamily: Cerambycinae
- Tribe: Molorchini
- Genus: Epania; Pascoe, 1858

= Epania =

Genus of beetles

Epania is a genus of longhorn beetles in the family Cerambycidae. There are more than 60 described species in Epania, found mainly in Southeast Asia, but also in southern and eastern Asia, and Australia.

== Species ==
These 69 species belong to the genus Epania:

- Epania abdominalis Holzschuh, 1984 (Nepal)
- Epania adustata Holzschuh, 1999 (Laos)
- Epania albertisi Breuning, 1956 (Papua New Guinea)
- Epania amoorae Gardner, 1926 (India)
- Epania arisana Matsushita & Tamanuki, 1942 (China, Taiwan)
- Epania asperanus Holzschuh, 1989 (Pakistan)
- Epania assamensis Gardner, 1926 (India)
- Epania atra Hayashi, 1978 (China, Taiwan and temperate Asia)
- Epania atramentaria Holzschuh, 2010 (China)
- Epania aurocollaris Heller, 1924 (Philippines)
- Epania australis Carter, 1928 (Australia)
- Epania bicoloricornis Pic, 1950 (Vietnam)
- Epania bipartita Holzschuh, 2006 (Malaysia, Borneo)
- Epania brachelytra Gressitt & Rondon, 1970 (Laos)
- Epania brevipennis Pascoe, 1869 (Taiwan, Malaysia, Borneo)
- Epania calophylli Gardner, 1926 (India)
- Epania cingalensis Gardner, 1936 (Sri Lanka)
- Epania cobaltina Gressitt, 1951 (Papua New Guinea)
- Epania corusca Holzschuh, 2007 (Thailand)
- Epania cribricollis Pic, 1933 (India)
- Epania dilaticornis Hayashi, 1951 (Japan)
- Epania discisa Holzschuh, 2006 (China)
- Epania discolor Pascoe, 1869 (Indonesia)
- Epania finitima Holzschuh, 2007 (Laos)
- Epania fordi Gressitt, 1959 (Papua New Guinea)
- Epania fortipes Pic, 1933 (India)
- Epania fulvonotata (Nonfried, 1894) (Indonesia, Sumatra)
- Epania funeta Holzschuh, 2011 (Malaysia, Borneo)
- Epania fustis Holzschuh, 2008 (Laos)
- Epania gemellata Holzschuh, 1991 (Thailand)
- Epania gressitti Huang, Chen & Cai, 2014 (Papua New Guinea)
- Epania ignota Holzschuh, 2015
- Epania immaculata Kano, 1933
- Epania iriei Takakuwa, 1981 (Japan)
- Epania javana Pic, 1942 (Indonesia, Java)
- Epania kasaharai Niisato, 2002 (Vietnam)
- Epania kostali Holzschuh, 2007 (India, Thailand)
- Epania lacunosa Holzschuh, 2009 (Laos)
- Epania lineola Pic, 1933 (Vietnam)
- Epania maculata Gressitt & Rondon, 1970 (Laos)
- Epania metallescens Holzschuh, 1991 (Thailand)
- Epania minuta Pic, 1935 (Vietnam)
- Epania mira Holzschuh, 1991 (Thailand)
- Epania mundali Gardner, 1936 (India, Nepal)
- Epania pallescens Heller, 1924 (Philippines)
- Epania parvula Gressitt & Rondon, 1970 (Laos)
- Epania paulla Pascoe, 1869 (Malaysia, Borneo)
- Epania paulloides Niisato, 2002 (Vietnam)
- Epania petra Heller, 1924 (Borneo, Malaysia)
- Epania picipes Holzschuh, 1984 (Nepal)
- Epania posticalis Holzschuh, 2006 (Malaysia, Borneo)
- Epania praestans Holzschuh, 2008 (Laos)
- Epania pudens Holzschuh, 1993 (China)
- Epania pudica Holzschuh, 2011 (Malaysia, Borneo)
- Epania pusio Pascoe, 1869 (Malaysia, Singapore, Borneo)
- Epania quadra Holzschuh, 2011 (Malaysia, Borneo)
- Epania ruficollis Pic, 1922 (Laos, Vietnam, Thailand)
- Epania rufipes Gressitt, 1951 (Salomon Islands)
- Epania rugosulipennis Holzschuh, 2011 (Laos)
- Epania sarawackensis (Thomson, 1857) (Malaysia, Borneo)
- Epania scapularis Holzschuh, 1991 (Thailand)
- Epania schwarzeri Hayashi, 1969 (Taiwan)
- Epania septemtrionalis Hayashi, 1951 (Japan, South Korea)
- Epania shikokensis Ohbayashi, 1936 (China, Japan)
- Epania Singaporeensis (Thomson, 1857) (Malaysia, Singapore, Borneo)
- Epania skalei Holzschuh, 2016
- Epania subchalybeata Miwa, 1931 (Taiwan and temperate Asia)
- Epania subvirida Gressitt, 1959 (Papua New Guinea)
- Epania vietnamica Niisato & Saito, 1996 (Vietnam)
