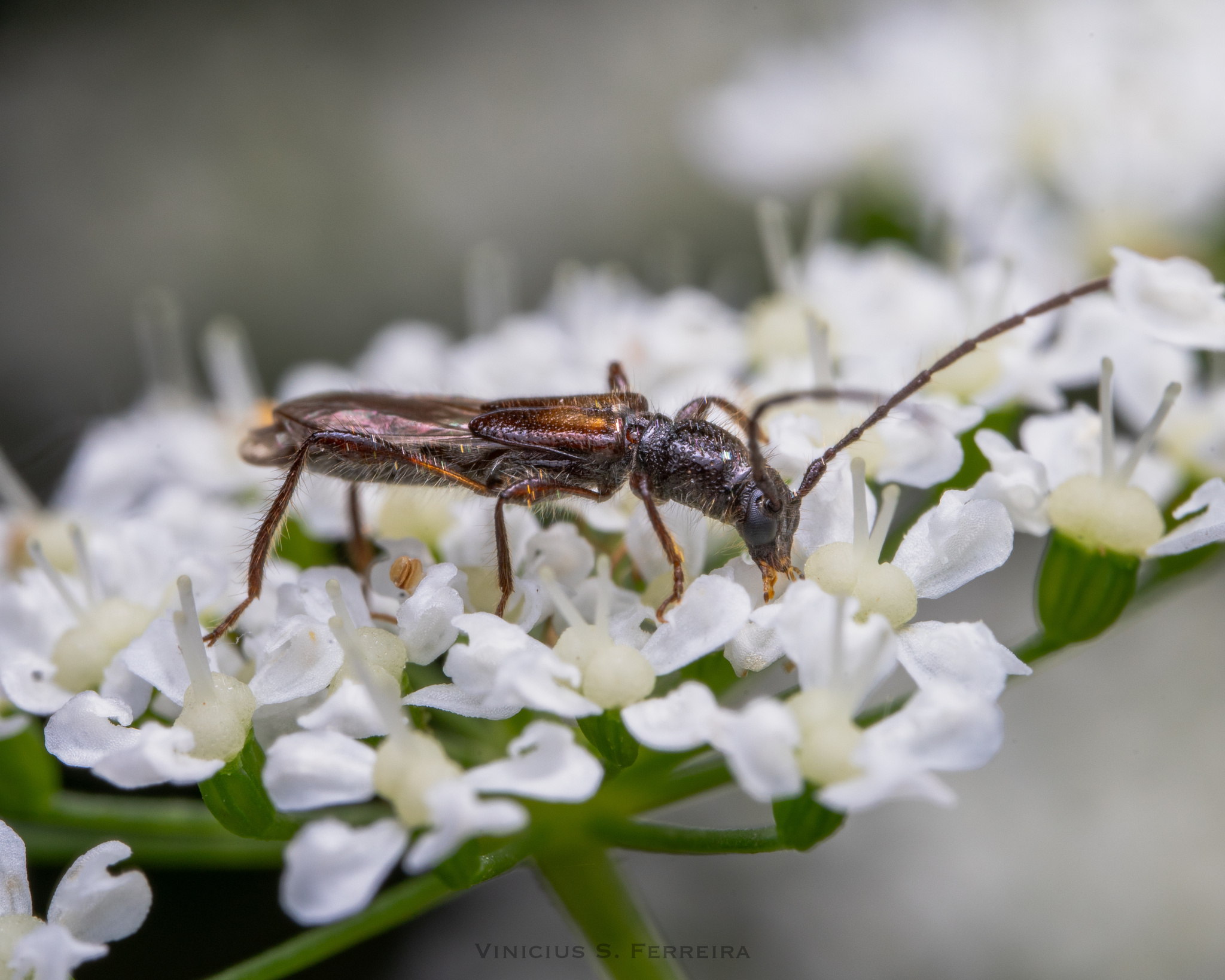

Scientific classification
- Kingdom: Animalia
- Phylum: Arthropoda
- Clade: Pancrustacea
- Class: Insecta
- Order: Coleoptera
- Suborder: Polyphaga
- Infraorder: Cucujiformia
- Family: Cerambycidae
- Genus: Molorchus
- Subgenus: Molorchus
- Species: M. umbellatarum

Binomial name
- Molorchus umbellatarum (Schreber, 1759)

Synonyms
- Necydalis umbellatarum Linnaeus, 1767; Coenoptera umbellatarum (Schreber, 1759); Glaphyra (Glaphyra) umbellatarum (Schreber, 1759); Conchopterus umbellatarum (Schreber, 1759); Glaphyra umbellatarum (Schreber, 1759); Linomius umbellatorum (Schreber, 1759)

= Molorchus umbellatarum =

Species of longhorn beetle

Molorchus umbellatarum is a species of longhorn beetles in the tribe Molorchini. It is found throughout Europe including southern Britain.

== Taxonomy and nomenclature ==
This species is often known by the synonym Glaphyra umbellatarum and may be called the "Pear Shortwing Beetle". It is placed in the subgenus Molorchus and is the type species in its genus under the basionym Necydalis umbellatarum Schreber, 1759. This species has two varieties:

- Molorchus umbellatarum var. diversipes Pic, 1897
- Molorchus umbellatarum var. minimus (Scopoli, 1763)

== Description ==
A small (5–8 mm), slender, dark brown longhorn beetle with shortened elytra. The species can only be confused with the related short-winged spruce beetle Molorchus minor, In M. umbellatarum the third segment of the antennae is not particularly long, less than half as long as the pronotum. In M. minor, it’s about as long as the pronotum. Additionally, the thighs are somewhat less club-shaped than in M. minor. The antennae are fairly thin and noticeably longer than the body. The body is fairly evenly wide. The head is relatively large and broad, the pronotum slightly longer than wide, arched with a couple of side knobs just behind the middle. The elytra are reddish-brown and cover less than half of the abdomen; the thin hind wings can’t fold under the elytra and lie folded over the rest of the abdomen. The legs are fairly long, the thighs clearly club-shaped, otherwise medium-strong.

== Biology ==
Besides feeding on pears, M. umbellatarum is known to consume: Castanea sativa (Sweet Chestnut), Viburnum opulus (Guelder rose), Frangula alnus (Alder Buckthorn), Euonymus europaeus (Spindle) and Cornus mas. Known parasitoids include Xorides indicatorius.
