= Merionoedopsis =

Scientific classification
- Domain: Eukaryota
- Kingdom: Animalia
- Phylum: Arthropoda
- Class: Insecta
- Order: Coleoptera
- Suborder: Polyphaga
- Infraorder: Cucujiformia
- Family: Cerambycidae
- Subfamily: Cerambycinae
- Tribe: Molorchini
- Genus: Merionoedopsis; Gounelle, 1911

Genus of beetles

Merionoedopsis is a genus of long-horned beetles in the family Cerambycidae. There are at least two described species in Merionoedopsis.

== Species ==
These two species belong to the genus Merionoedopsis:

- Merionoedopsis aeneiventris Gounelle, 1911
- Merionoedopsis brevipennis Melzer, 1935
