= Dysthaeta anomala =

Scientific classification
- Kingdom: Animalia
- Phylum: Arthropoda
- Class: Insecta
- Order: Coleoptera
- Suborder: Polyphaga
- Infraorder: Cucujiformia
- Family: Cerambycidae
- Tribe: Epicastini
- Genus: Dysthaeta
- Species: D. anomala

Binomial name
- Dysthaeta anomala Pascoe, 1859

Species of beetle

Dysthaeta anomala is a species of beetle in the family Cerambycidae. It was described by Pascoe in 1859. It is known from Australia.
