= Molorchus eburneus =

Scientific classification
- Kingdom: Animalia
- Phylum: Arthropoda
- Class: Insecta
- Order: Coleoptera
- Suborder: Polyphaga
- Infraorder: Cucujiformia
- Family: Cerambycidae
- Genus: Molorchus
- Species: M. eburneus

Binomial name
- Molorchus eburneus Linsley, 1931

Species of beetle

Molorchus eburneus is a species of beetle in the family Cerambycidae. It was described by Linsley in 1931.
