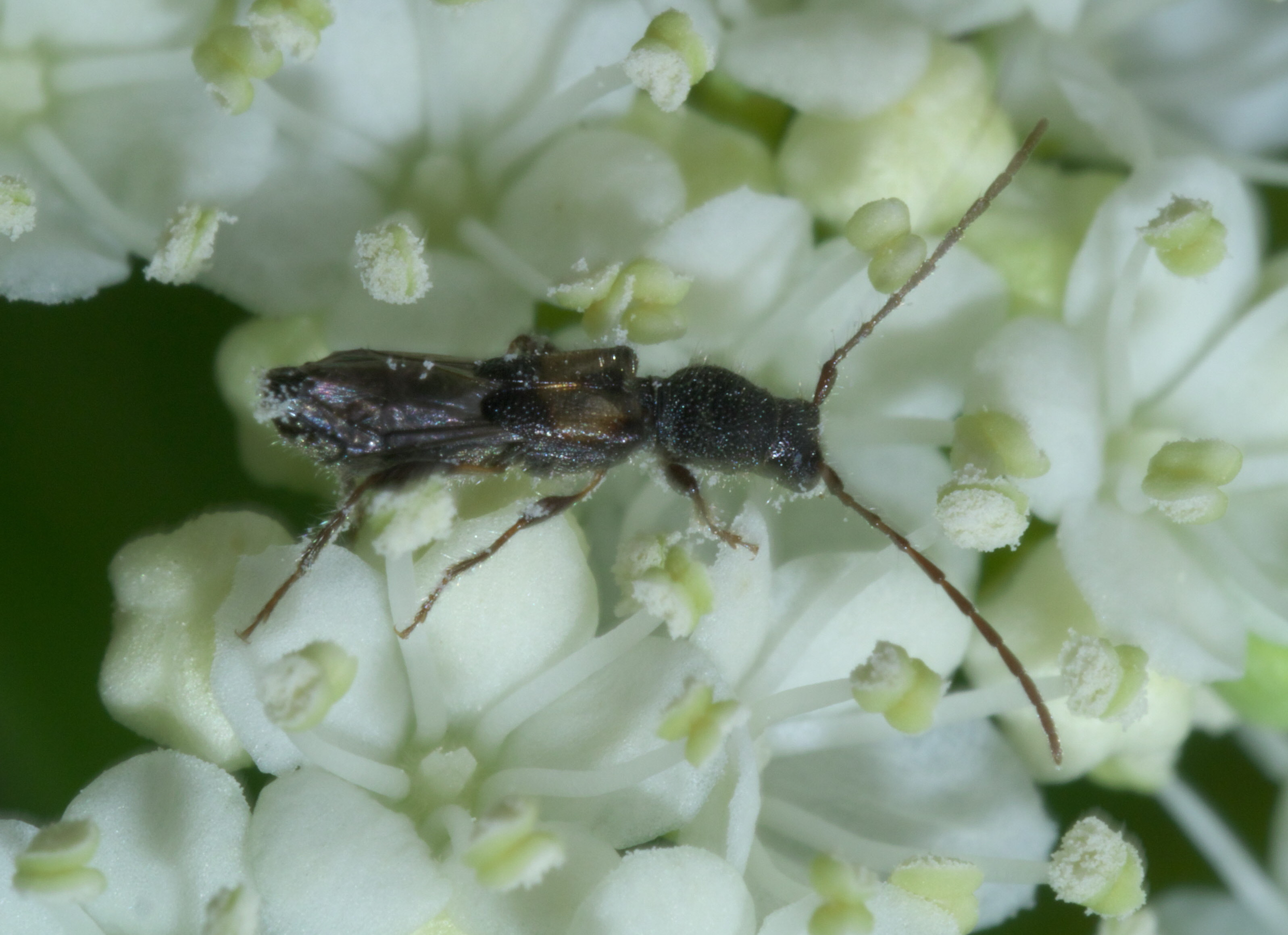

Scientific classification
- Domain: Eukaryota
- Kingdom: Animalia
- Phylum: Arthropoda
- Class: Insecta
- Order: Coleoptera
- Suborder: Polyphaga
- Infraorder: Cucujiformia
- Family: Cerambycidae
- Genus: Molorchus
- Subgenus: Molorchus
- Species: M. bimaculatus

Binomial name
- Molorchus bimaculatus Say, 1824

= Molorchus bimaculatus =

Species of beetle

Molorchus bimaculatus is a species of beetle in the family Cerambycidae. It was described by Thomas Say in 1824.

== Ecology ==
The larvae feed within the ligneous parts of hardwood trees and lianas such as Vitis. Adult beetles will eat at various flowers on species such as Rhus, Prunus, Malus, Cornus, and others.
