= Epicastini =

Scientific classification
- Domain: Eukaryota
- Kingdom: Animalia
- Phylum: Arthropoda
- Class: Insecta
- Order: Coleoptera
- Suborder: Polyphaga
- Infraorder: Cucujiformia
- Family: Cerambycidae
- Subfamily: Lamiinae
- Tribe: Epicastini; Thomson, 1864

Tribe of beetles

Epicastini is a tribe of longhorn beetles of the subfamily Lamiinae. It was described by Thomson in 1864.

== Taxonomy ==
- Brachaciptera Lea, 1917
- Dysthaeta Pascoe, 1859
- Oricopis Pascoe, 1863
- Paroricopis Breuning, 1958
