= Brachaciptera =

Scientific classification
- Kingdom: Animalia
- Phylum: Arthropoda
- Class: Insecta
- Order: Coleoptera
- Suborder: Polyphaga
- Infraorder: Cucujiformia
- Family: Cerambycidae
- Tribe: Molorchini
- Genus: Brachaciptera; Lea, 1917

Genus of beetles

Brachaciptera is a genus of longhorn beetles of the subfamily Cerambycinae, containing the following species:

- Brachaciptera auricoma Lea, 1917
- Brachaciptera tibialis Lea, 1917
