= Merionoedopsis aeneiventris =

Scientific classification
- Domain: Eukaryota
- Kingdom: Animalia
- Phylum: Arthropoda
- Class: Insecta
- Order: Coleoptera
- Suborder: Polyphaga
- Infraorder: Cucujiformia
- Family: Cerambycidae
- Genus: Merionoedopsis
- Species: M. aeneiventris

Binomial name
- Merionoedopsis aeneiventris Gounelle, 1911

Species of beetle

Merionoedopsis aeneiventris is a species of beetle in the family Cerambycidae. It was described by Gounelle in 1911.
