= Merionoedopsis brevipennis =

Scientific classification
- Domain: Eukaryota
- Kingdom: Animalia
- Phylum: Arthropoda
- Class: Insecta
- Order: Coleoptera
- Suborder: Polyphaga
- Infraorder: Cucujiformia
- Family: Cerambycidae
- Genus: Merionoedopsis
- Species: M. brevipennis

Binomial name
- Merionoedopsis brevipennis Melzer, 1934

Species of beetle

Merionoedopsis brevipennis is a species of beetle in the family Cerambycidae. It was described by Melzer in 1934.
