= Molorchus longicollis =

Scientific classification
- Domain: Eukaryota
- Kingdom: Animalia
- Phylum: Arthropoda
- Class: Insecta
- Order: Coleoptera
- Suborder: Polyphaga
- Infraorder: Cucujiformia
- Family: Cerambycidae
- Genus: Molorchus
- Subgenus: Molorchus
- Species: M. longicollis

Binomial name
- Molorchus longicollis LeConte, 1873

Species of beetle

Molorchus longicollis is a species of beetle in the family Cerambycidae. It was described by John Lawrence LeConte in 1873.
