= Estolides =

Estolides may refer to:

- a class of fatty acid esters
- Desmiphorini, also known as Estolides, a tribe of beetles

== See also ==
- Estoloides, a genus of beetles
