= Estoloides venezuelensis =

Scientific classification
- Kingdom: Animalia
- Phylum: Arthropoda
- Class: Insecta
- Order: Coleoptera
- Suborder: Polyphaga
- Infraorder: Cucujiformia
- Family: Cerambycidae
- Genus: Estoloides
- Species: E. venezuelensis

Binomial name
- Estoloides venezuelensis Breuning, 1942

Species of beetle

Estoloides venezuelensis is a species of beetle in the family Cerambycidae. It was described by Stephan von Breuning in 1942. It is known from Venezuela, from which its species epithet is derived.
