= Estoloides aquilonius =

Scientific classification
- Domain: Eukaryota
- Kingdom: Animalia
- Phylum: Arthropoda
- Class: Insecta
- Order: Coleoptera
- Suborder: Polyphaga
- Infraorder: Cucujiformia
- Family: Cerambycidae
- Genus: Estoloides
- Species: E. aquilonius

Binomial name
- Estoloides aquilonius Linsley & Chemsak, 1984

Species of beetle

Estoloides aquilonius is a species of beetle in the family Cerambycidae. It was described by Linsley and Chemsak in 1984. It is known from the United States.
