= Estoloides andresi =

Scientific classification
- Kingdom: Animalia
- Phylum: Arthropoda
- Class: Insecta
- Order: Coleoptera
- Suborder: Polyphaga
- Infraorder: Cucujiformia
- Family: Cerambycidae
- Genus: Estoloides
- Species: E. andresi

Binomial name
- Estoloides andresi (Breuning, 1974)

Species of beetle

Estoloides andresi is a species of beetle in the family Cerambycidae. It was described by Stephan von Breuning in 1974.
