= Estoloides scabracaulis =

Scientific classification
- Domain: Eukaryota
- Kingdom: Animalia
- Phylum: Arthropoda
- Class: Insecta
- Order: Coleoptera
- Suborder: Polyphaga
- Infraorder: Cucujiformia
- Family: Cerambycidae
- Genus: Estoloides
- Species: E. scabracaulis

Binomial name
- Estoloides scabracaulis Chemsak & Noguera, 1993

Species of beetle

Estoloides scabracaulis is a species of beetle in the family Cerambycidae. It was described by Chemsak and Noguera in 1993. It is known from Mexico.
