= Estoloides flavoscutellaris =

Scientific classification
- Domain: Eukaryota
- Kingdom: Animalia
- Phylum: Arthropoda
- Class: Insecta
- Order: Coleoptera
- Suborder: Polyphaga
- Infraorder: Cucujiformia
- Family: Cerambycidae
- Genus: Estoloides
- Species: E. flavoscutellaris

Binomial name
- Estoloides flavoscutellaris Galileo, Bezark & Santos-Silva, 2016

Species of beetle

Estoloides flavoscutellaris is a species of beetle in the family Cerambycidae. It was described by Galileo, Bezark and Santos-Silva in 2016.
