= Estoloides perforata =

Scientific classification
- Domain: Eukaryota
- Kingdom: Animalia
- Phylum: Arthropoda
- Class: Insecta
- Order: Coleoptera
- Suborder: Polyphaga
- Infraorder: Cucujiformia
- Family: Cerambycidae
- Genus: Estoloides
- Species: E. perforata

Binomial name
- Estoloides perforata (Bates, 1872)

Synonyms
- Estola perforata Bates, 1872

Species of beetle

Estoloides perforata is a species of beetle in the family Cerambycidae. It was described by Henry Walter Bates in 1872. It is known from Curaçao, Mexico, Trinidad, and Venezuela.
