= Estoloides medioplagiata =

Scientific classification
- Domain: Eukaryota
- Kingdom: Animalia
- Phylum: Arthropoda
- Class: Insecta
- Order: Coleoptera
- Suborder: Polyphaga
- Infraorder: Cucujiformia
- Family: Cerambycidae
- Genus: Estoloides
- Species: E. medioplagiata

Binomial name
- Estoloides medioplagiata Vitali, 2007

Synonyms
- Estoloides prope affinis (Breuning) Vitali & Rezbanyai-Reser, 2003

Species of beetle

Estoloides medioplagiata is a species of beetle in the family Cerambycidae. It was described by Vitali in 2007. It is known from Jamaica.
