= Estoloides setipes =

Scientific classification
- Kingdom: Animalia
- Phylum: Arthropoda
- Clade: Pancrustacea
- Class: Insecta
- Order: Coleoptera
- Suborder: Polyphaga
- Infraorder: Cucujiformia
- Family: Cerambycidae
- Genus: Estoloides
- Species: E. setipes

Binomial name
- Estoloides setipes Vlasak & Santos-Silva, 2026

Species of beetle

Estoloides setipes is a species of beetle of the family Cerambycidae. It is found in Ecuador.

== Description ==
Adults reach a length of about 7.75–10.6 mm (0.305–0.417 in). The integument is mostly dark brown. The ventral mouthparts are dark reddish brown, except for the dark brown mentum and dark brown palpomeres with an orangish-brown apex. The anteclypeus and anterior half of the labrum are brown with irregular light-brown areas and the base of antennomeres IV-XI is orangish brown, gradually lighter from V. The apex of antennomere XI is light orangish brown. The meso- and metatibiae have irregular reddish-brown areas on the basal half and apically. The apex of abdominal ventrites 1-4 is distinctly lighter than the remaining surface.

== Etymology ==
The species name is derived from the Latin seta (meaning bristle or hair) and pes (meaning foot or leg) and refers to the setose limbs of this species.
