= Estoloides leucosticta =

Scientific classification
- Kingdom: Animalia
- Phylum: Arthropoda
- Clade: Pancrustacea
- Class: Insecta
- Order: Coleoptera
- Suborder: Polyphaga
- Infraorder: Cucujiformia
- Family: Cerambycidae
- Genus: Estoloides
- Species: E. leucosticta

Binomial name
- Estoloides leucosticta (Bates, 1885)

Species of beetle

Estoloides leucosticta is a species of beetle in the family Cerambycidae. It was described by Henry Walter Bates (1825–1892) in 1885. It is known from Mexico.
