= Estoloides bellefontanei =

Scientific classification
- Domain: Eukaryota
- Kingdom: Animalia
- Phylum: Arthropoda
- Class: Insecta
- Order: Coleoptera
- Suborder: Polyphaga
- Infraorder: Cucujiformia
- Family: Cerambycidae
- Genus: Estoloides
- Species: E. bellefontanei

Binomial name
- Estoloides bellefontanei Touroult, 2012

Species of beetle

Estoloides bellefontanei is a species of beetle in the family Cerambycidae. It was described by Touroult in 2012.
