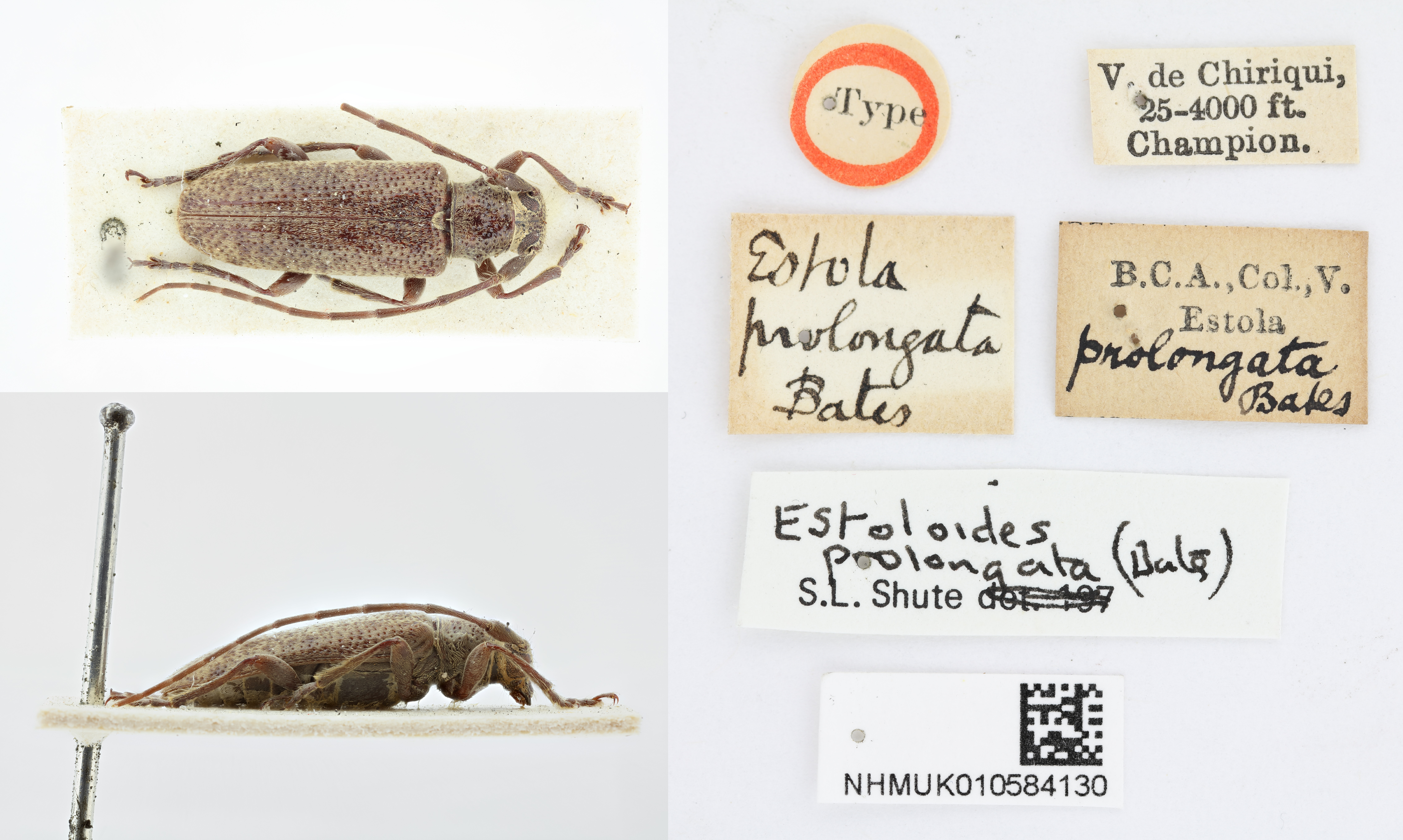

Scientific classification
- Domain: Eukaryota
- Kingdom: Animalia
- Phylum: Arthropoda
- Class: Insecta
- Order: Coleoptera
- Suborder: Polyphaga
- Infraorder: Cucujiformia
- Family: Cerambycidae
- Genus: Estoloides
- Species: E. prolongata

Binomial name
- Estoloides prolongata (Bates, 1885)

= Estoloides prolongata =

Species of beetle

Estoloides prolongata is a species of beetle in the family Cerambycidae. It was described by Bates in 1885. It is known from Panama.
