= Estoloides sparsa =

Scientific classification
- Domain: Eukaryota
- Kingdom: Animalia
- Phylum: Arthropoda
- Class: Insecta
- Order: Coleoptera
- Suborder: Polyphaga
- Infraorder: Cucujiformia
- Family: Cerambycidae
- Genus: Estoloides
- Species: E. sparsa

Binomial name
- Estoloides sparsa Linsley, 1942

Species of beetle

Estoloides sparsa is a species of beetle in the family Cerambycidae. It was described by Linsley in 1942. It is known from Baja California.
