= Estoloides costaricensis =

Scientific classification
- Kingdom: Animalia
- Phylum: Arthropoda
- Class: Insecta
- Order: Coleoptera
- Suborder: Polyphaga
- Infraorder: Cucujiformia
- Family: Cerambycidae
- Genus: Estoloides
- Species: E. costaricensis

Binomial name
- Estoloides costaricensis Breuning, 1940

Species of beetle

Estoloides costaricensis is a species of beetle in the family Cerambycidae. It was described by Stephan von Breuning in 1940. It is known from Costa Rica, Honduras, and Nicaragua.
