= Estoloides galapagoensis =

Scientific classification
- Domain: Eukaryota
- Kingdom: Animalia
- Phylum: Arthropoda
- Class: Insecta
- Order: Coleoptera
- Suborder: Polyphaga
- Infraorder: Cucujiformia
- Family: Cerambycidae
- Genus: Estoloides
- Species: E. galapagoensis

Binomial name
- Estoloides galapagoensis (Blair, 1933)

Species of beetle

Estoloides galapagoensis is a species of beetle in the family Cerambycidae. It was described by Blair in 1933. It is known from the Galápagos Islands.
