= Estoloides =

Scientific classification
- Kingdom: Animalia
- Phylum: Arthropoda
- Clade: Pancrustacea
- Class: Insecta
- Order: Coleoptera
- Suborder: Polyphaga
- Infraorder: Cucujiformia
- Family: Cerambycidae
- Tribe: Desmiphorini
- Genus: Estoloides; Breuning, 1940

Synonyms
- Parestoloides Breuning, 1940; Mimestoloides Breuning, 1974

Genus of beetles

Estoloides is a genus of longhorn beetles of the subfamily Lamiinae.

== Species ==
Estoloides contains the following species:

- Estoloides affinis Breuning, 1940
- Estoloides alboscutellaris Breuning, 1943
- Estoloides andresi (Breuning, 1974)
- Estoloides annulicornis Breuning, 1940
- Estoloides aquilonius Linsley & Chemsak, 1984
- Estoloides basigranulata Breuning, 1943
- Estoloides bellefontanei Touroult, 2012
- Estoloides chamelae Chemsak & Noguera, 1993
- Estoloides chiapensis Santos-Silva, Wappes & Galileo, 2018
- Estoloides costaricensis Breuning, 1940
- Estoloides dthomasi Santos-Silva, Wappes & Galileo, 2018
- Estoloides elongata Bezark, Botero & Santos-Silva, 2022
- Estoloides esthlogenoides Breuning, 1943
- Estoloides flavoscutellaris Galileo, Bezark & Santos-Silva, 2016
- Estoloides fulvitarsis (Bates, 1885)
- Estoloides galapagoensis (Blair, 1933)
- Estoloides giesberti Santos-Silva, Wappes & Galileo, 2018
- Estoloides grossepunctata Breuning, 1940
- Estoloides jaliscana Heffern, Nascimento & Santos-Silva, 2018
- Estoloides leucosticta (Bates, 1885)
- Estoloides longicornis Breuning, 1940
- Estoloides maesi Santos-Silva, Wappes & Galileo, 2018
- Estoloides medioplagiata Vitali, 2007
- Estoloides medvegyi Audureau, 2020
- Estoloides morrisi Santos-Silva, Wappes & Galileo, 2018
- Estoloides nayeliae Santos-Silva, Wappes & Galileo, 2018
- Estoloides noguerai Santos-Silva, Wappes & Galileo, 2018
- Estoloides paralboscutellaris Breuning, 1971
- Estoloides pararufipes Breuning, 1974
- Estoloides parva Breuning, 1940
- Estoloides perforata (Bates, 1872)
- Estoloides prolongata (Bates, 1885)
- Estoloides pubescens Santos-Silva, Wappes & Galileo, 2018
- Estoloides reflexa Breuning, 1940
- Estoloides rufipes Breuning, 1940
- Estoloides scabracaulis Chemsak & Noguera, 1993
- Estoloides schusteri Santos-Silva, Wappes & Galileo, 2018
- Estoloides setipes Vlasak & Santos-Silva, 2026
- Estoloides sinaloana Heffern, Santos-Silva & Botero, 2019
- Estoloides sordida (LeConte, 1873)
- Estoloides sparsa Linsley, 1942
- Estoloides strandiella Breuning, 1940
- Estoloides uyucana Santos-Silva, Wappes & Galileo, 2018
- Estoloides vandenberghei Santos-Silva, Wappes & Galileo, 2018
- Estoloides venezuelensis Breuning, 1942
