= Blabia costaricensis =

Scientific classification
- Kingdom: Animalia
- Phylum: Arthropoda
- Class: Insecta
- Order: Coleoptera
- Suborder: Polyphaga
- Infraorder: Cucujiformia
- Family: Cerambycidae
- Genus: Blabia
- Species: B. costaricensis

Binomial name
- Blabia costaricensis Breuning, 1943

Species of beetle

Blabia costaricensis is a species of beetle in the family Cerambycidae. It was described by Breuning in 1943. It is known from Costa Rica (from which its species epithet is derived), Honduras and Panama.
