= Blabia galba =

Scientific classification
- Domain: Eukaryota
- Kingdom: Animalia
- Phylum: Arthropoda
- Class: Insecta
- Order: Coleoptera
- Suborder: Polyphaga
- Infraorder: Cucujiformia
- Family: Cerambycidae
- Genus: Blabia
- Species: B. galba

Binomial name
- Blabia galba Martins & Galileo, 1995

Species of beetle

Blabia galba is a species of beetle in the family Cerambycidae. It was described by Martins and Galileo in 1995. It is known from Ecuador.
