= Blabia rendira =

Scientific classification
- Domain: Eukaryota
- Kingdom: Animalia
- Phylum: Arthropoda
- Class: Insecta
- Order: Coleoptera
- Suborder: Polyphaga
- Infraorder: Cucujiformia
- Family: Cerambycidae
- Genus: Blabia
- Species: B. rendira

Binomial name
- Blabia rendira Galileo & Martins, 1998

Species of beetle

Blabia rendira is a species of beetle in the family Cerambycidae. It was described by Galileo and Martins in 1998. It is known from Peru.
