= Blabia banga =

Scientific classification
- Domain: Eukaryota
- Kingdom: Animalia
- Phylum: Arthropoda
- Class: Insecta
- Order: Coleoptera
- Suborder: Polyphaga
- Infraorder: Cucujiformia
- Family: Cerambycidae
- Genus: Blabia
- Species: B. banga

Binomial name
- Blabia banga Galileo & Martins, 1998

Species of beetle

Blabia banga is a species of beetle in the family Cerambycidae. It was described by Galileo and Martins in 1998. It is known from Ecuador.
