= Blabia bicuspis =

Scientific classification
- Domain: Eukaryota
- Kingdom: Animalia
- Phylum: Arthropoda
- Class: Insecta
- Order: Coleoptera
- Suborder: Polyphaga
- Infraorder: Cucujiformia
- Family: Cerambycidae
- Genus: Blabia
- Species: B. bicuspis

Binomial name
- Blabia bicuspis (Bates, 1866)

Synonyms
- Prymnosis bicuspis Bates, 1866

Species of beetle

Blabia bicuspis is a species of beetle in the family Cerambycidae. It was described by Henry Walter Bates in 1866. It is known from Colombia, Brazil, Peru and Ecuador.
