= Blabia masoni =

Scientific classification
- Domain: Eukaryota
- Kingdom: Animalia
- Phylum: Arthropoda
- Class: Insecta
- Order: Coleoptera
- Suborder: Polyphaga
- Infraorder: Cucujiformia
- Family: Cerambycidae
- Genus: Blabia
- Species: B. masoni

Binomial name
- Blabia masoni (Aurivillius, 1927)

Synonyms
- Prymnopteryx masoni Aurivillius, 1927

Species of beetle

Blabia masoni is a species of beetle in the family Cerambycidae. It was described by Per Olof Christopher Aurivillius in 1927. It is known from Colombia.
