= Blabia bicolor =

Scientific classification
- Domain: Eukaryota
- Kingdom: Animalia
- Phylum: Arthropoda
- Class: Insecta
- Order: Coleoptera
- Suborder: Polyphaga
- Infraorder: Cucujiformia
- Family: Cerambycidae
- Genus: Blabia
- Species: B. bicolor

Binomial name
- Blabia bicolor Martins & Galileo, 2005

Species of beetle

Blabia bicolor is a species of beetle in the family Cerambycidae. It was described by Martins and Galileo in 2005. It is known from Colombia.
