= Blabia truncata =

Scientific classification
- Kingdom: Animalia
- Phylum: Arthropoda
- Class: Insecta
- Order: Coleoptera
- Suborder: Polyphaga
- Infraorder: Cucujiformia
- Family: Cerambycidae
- Genus: Blabia
- Species: B. truncata

Binomial name
- Blabia truncata Breuning, 1940

Species of beetle

Blabia truncata is a species of beetle in the family Cerambycidae. It was described by Breuning in 1940. It is known from Colombia and Ecuador.
