= Blabia colobotheoides =

Scientific classification
- Domain: Eukaryota
- Kingdom: Animalia
- Phylum: Arthropoda
- Class: Insecta
- Order: Coleoptera
- Suborder: Polyphaga
- Infraorder: Cucujiformia
- Family: Cerambycidae
- Genus: Blabia
- Species: B. colobotheoides

Binomial name
- Blabia colobotheoides Thomson, 1864

Species of beetle

Blabia colobotheoides is a species of beetle in the family Cerambycidae. It was described by Thomson in 1864. It is known from Colombia and Peru.
