= Blabia bituberosa =

Scientific classification
- Kingdom: Animalia
- Phylum: Arthropoda
- Class: Insecta
- Order: Coleoptera
- Suborder: Polyphaga
- Infraorder: Cucujiformia
- Family: Cerambycidae
- Genus: Blabia
- Species: B. bituberosa

Binomial name
- Blabia bituberosa (Breuning, 1940)

Synonyms
- Prymnopteryx bituberosa Breuning, 1940

Species of beetle

Blabia bituberosa is a species of beetle in the family Cerambycidae. It was described by Breuning in 1940. It is known from Colombia.
