= Blabia piscoides =

Scientific classification
- Domain: Eukaryota
- Kingdom: Animalia
- Phylum: Arthropoda
- Class: Insecta
- Order: Coleoptera
- Suborder: Polyphaga
- Infraorder: Cucujiformia
- Family: Cerambycidae
- Genus: Blabia
- Species: B. piscoides

Binomial name
- Blabia piscoides (Thomson, 1868)

Synonyms
- Prymnopteryx piscoides Thomson, 1868

Species of beetle

Blabia piscoides is a species of beetle in the family Cerambycidae. It was described by Thomson in 1868. It is known from Venezuela.
