= Blabia magdalena =

Scientific classification
- Domain: Eukaryota
- Kingdom: Animalia
- Phylum: Arthropoda
- Class: Insecta
- Order: Coleoptera
- Suborder: Polyphaga
- Infraorder: Cucujiformia
- Family: Cerambycidae
- Genus: Blabia
- Species: B. magdalena

Binomial name
- Blabia magdalena Martins & Galileo, 1995

Species of beetle

Blabia magdalena is a species of beetle in the family Cerambycidae. It was described by Martins and Galileo in 1995. It is known from Colombia.
