= Blabia =

Scientific classification
- Domain: Eukaryota
- Kingdom: Animalia
- Phylum: Arthropoda
- Class: Insecta
- Order: Coleoptera
- Suborder: Polyphaga
- Infraorder: Cucujiformia
- Family: Cerambycidae
- Tribe: Desmiphorini
- Genus: Blabia

Genus of beetles

Blabia is a genus of longhorn beetles of the subfamily Lamiinae, containing the following species:

- Blabia alboseta Galileo, Santos-Silva, and Bezark, 2016
- Blabia banga Galileo & Martins, 1998
- Blabia bicolor Martins & Galileo, 2005
- Blabia bicuspis (Bates, 1866)
- Blabia bituberosa (Breuning, 1940)
- Blabia colobotheoides Thomson, 1864
- Blabia costaricensis Breuning, 1943
- Blabia cristulata Martins & Galileo, 1995
- Blabia epicharis Martins & Galileo, 1995
- Blabia exotica Martins & Galileo, 1995
- Blabia ferina Martins & Galileo, 1995
- Blabia galba Martins & Galileo, 1995
- Blabia gemma Martins & Galileo, 1995
- Blabia incompta Martins & Galileo, 1995
- Blabia intricata Martins & Galileo, 1995
- Blabia longipennis Galileo & Martins, 2003
- Blabia magdalena Martins & Galileo, 1995
- Blabia masoni (Aurivillius, 1927)
- Blabia meinerti (Aurivillius, 1900)
- Blabia oculifera Martins & Galileo, 1995
- Blabia piscoides (Thomson, 1868)
- Blabia rendira Galileo & Martins, 1998
- Blabia similis (Breuning, 1940)
- Blabia spinella Martins & Galileo, 1995
- Blabia strandiella Breuning, 1943
- Blabia truncata Breuning, 1940
