= Blabia meinerti =

Scientific classification
- Domain: Eukaryota
- Kingdom: Animalia
- Phylum: Arthropoda
- Class: Insecta
- Order: Coleoptera
- Suborder: Polyphaga
- Infraorder: Cucujiformia
- Family: Cerambycidae
- Genus: Blabia
- Species: B. meinerti

Binomial name
- Blabia meinerti (Aurivillius, 1900)

Synonyms
- Prymnopteryx meinerti Aurivillius, 1900

Species of beetle

Blabia meinerti is a species of beetle in the family Cerambycidae. It was described by Per Olof Christopher Aurivillius in 1900. It is known from Colombia and Venezuela.
