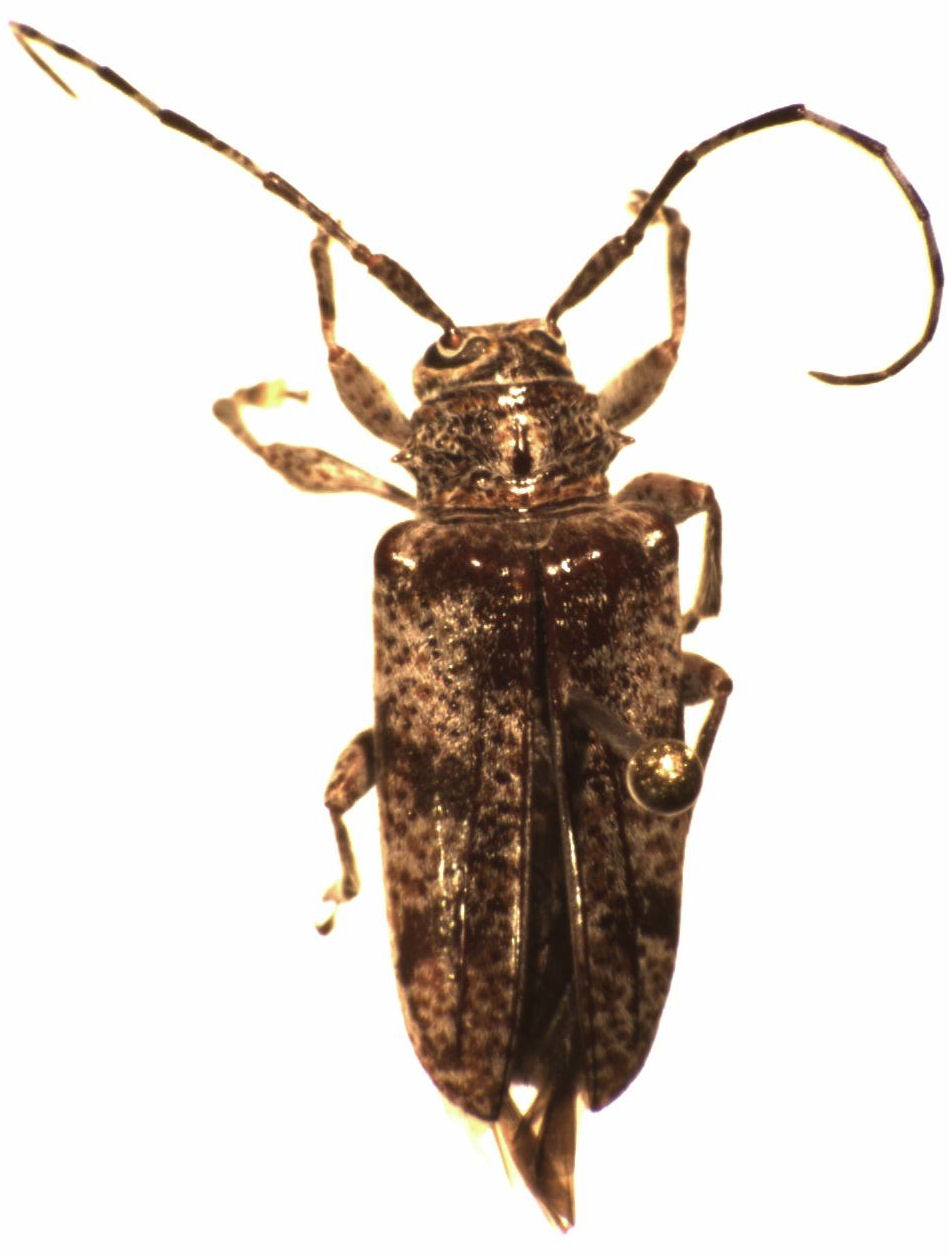
- adult Metalamia obtusipennis

Scientific classification
- Kingdom: Animalia
- Phylum: Arthropoda
- Class: Insecta
- Order: Coleoptera
- Suborder: Polyphaga
- Infraorder: Cucujiformia
- Family: Cerambycidae
- Genus: Metalamia
- Species: M. obtusipennis

Binomial name
- Metalamia obtusipennis (Bates, 1876)

= Metalamia obtusipennis =

Species of beetle

Metalamia obtusipennis is a species of beetle in the family Cerambycidae. It was described by Henry Walter Bates in 1876. It is known from New Zealand.
