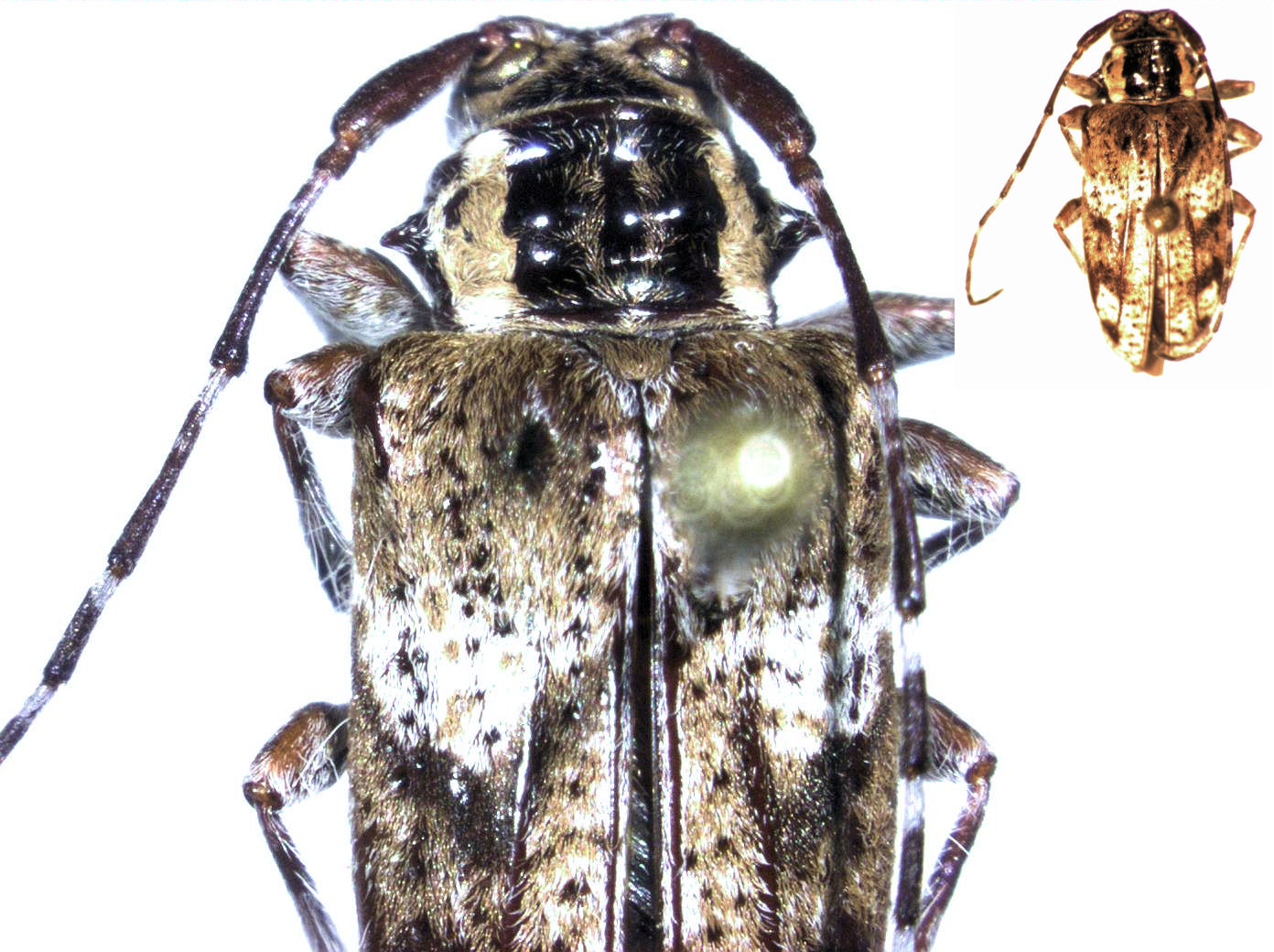
- Metalamia cuprea

Scientific classification
- Kingdom: Animalia
- Phylum: Arthropoda
- Class: Insecta
- Order: Coleoptera
- Suborder: Polyphaga
- Infraorder: Cucujiformia
- Family: Cerambycidae
- Tribe: Desmiphorini
- Genus: Metalamia

= Metalamia =

Genus of beetles

Metalamia is a genus of longhorn beetles of the subfamily Lamiinae, containing the following species:

- Metalamia cuprea Breuning, 1940
- Metalamia obtusipennis (Bates, 1876)
