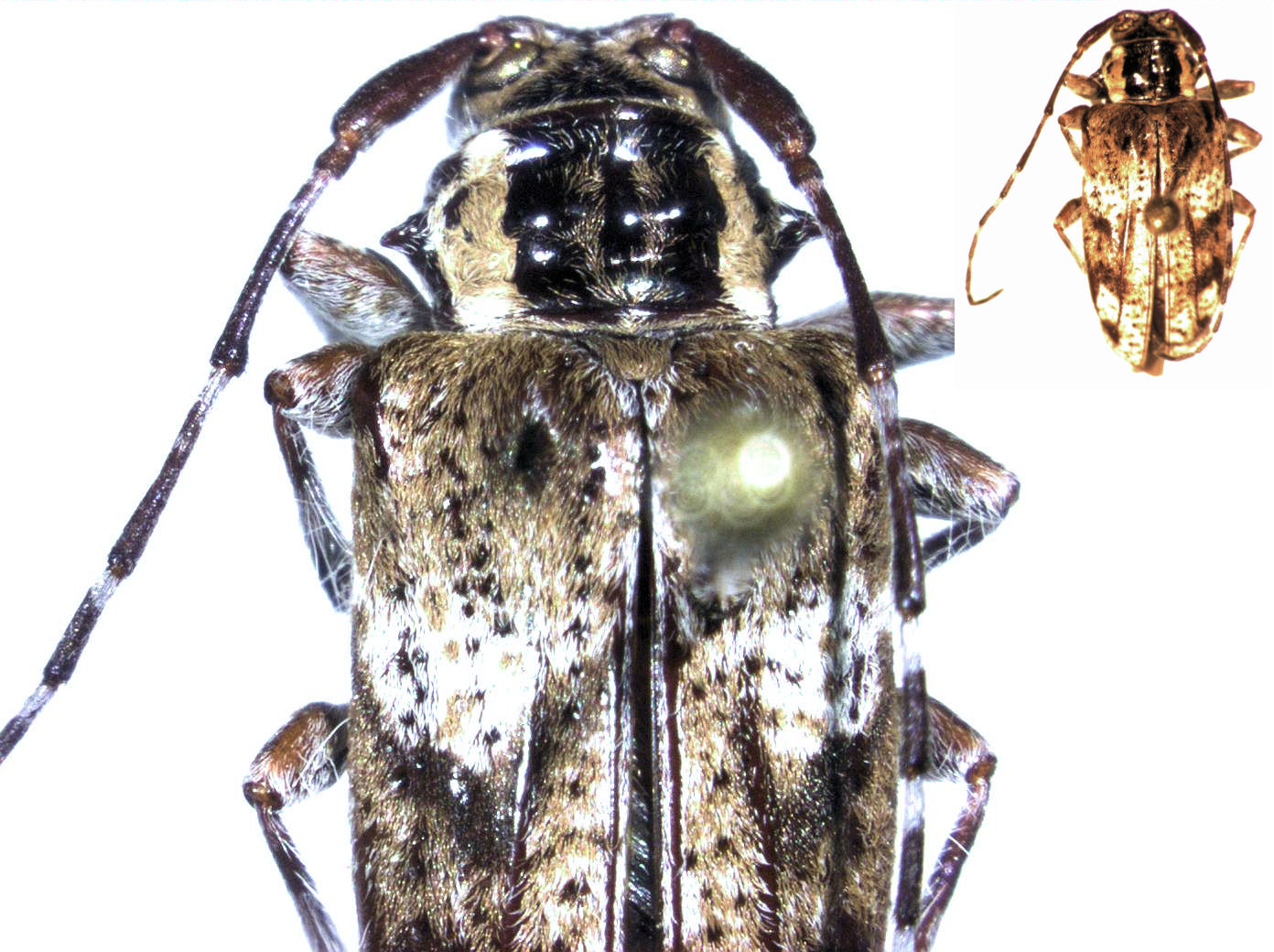

Scientific classification
- Kingdom: Animalia
- Phylum: Arthropoda
- Class: Insecta
- Order: Coleoptera
- Suborder: Polyphaga
- Infraorder: Cucujiformia
- Family: Cerambycidae
- Genus: Metalamia
- Species: M. cuprea

Binomial name
- Metalamia cuprea Breuning, 1940

= Metalamia cuprea =

Species of beetle

Metalamia cuprea is a species of beetle in the family Cerambycidae. It was described by Stephan von Breuning in 1940. It is known from New Zealand.
