= Panegyrtes apicale =

Scientific classification
- Kingdom: Animalia
- Phylum: Arthropoda
- Class: Insecta
- Order: Coleoptera
- Suborder: Polyphaga
- Infraorder: Cucujiformia
- Family: Cerambycidae
- Genus: Panegyrtes
- Species: P. apicale

Binomial name
- Panegyrtes apicale Martins & Galileo, 2005

Species of beetle

Panegyrtes apicale is a species of beetle in the family Cerambycidae. It was described by Martins and Galileo in 2005.
