= Panegyrtes lactescens =

Scientific classification
- Kingdom: Animalia
- Phylum: Arthropoda
- Class: Insecta
- Order: Coleoptera
- Suborder: Polyphaga
- Infraorder: Cucujiformia
- Family: Cerambycidae
- Genus: Panegyrtes
- Species: P. lactescens

Binomial name
- Panegyrtes lactescens Thomson, 1868

Species of beetle

Panegyrtes lactescens is a species of beetle in the family Cerambycidae. It was described by Thomson in 1868. It is known from Brazil.
