= Panegyrtes striatopunctatus =

Scientific classification
- Kingdom: Animalia
- Phylum: Arthropoda
- Class: Insecta
- Order: Coleoptera
- Suborder: Polyphaga
- Infraorder: Cucujiformia
- Family: Cerambycidae
- Genus: Panegyrtes
- Species: P. striatopunctatus

Binomial name
- Panegyrtes striatopunctatus Breuning, 1940

Species of beetle

Panegyrtes striatopunctatus is a species of beetle in the family Cerambycidae. It was described by Stephan von Breuning in 1940. It is known from Brazil.
