= Panegyrtes =

Scientific classification
- Kingdom: Animalia
- Phylum: Arthropoda
- Class: Insecta
- Order: Coleoptera
- Suborder: Polyphaga
- Infraorder: Cucujiformia
- Family: Cerambycidae
- Tribe: Desmiphorini
- Genus: Panegyrtes

Genus of beetles

Panegyrtes is a genus of longhorn beetles of the subfamily Lamiinae, containing the following species:

- Panegyrtes apicale Martins & Galileo, 2005
- Panegyrtes basale Galileo & Martins, 1995
- Panegyrtes bifasciatus Breuning, 1940
- Panegyrtes clarkei Galileo & Martins, 2007
- Panegyrtes crinitus Galileo & Martins, 1995
- Panegyrtes davidsoni Martins & Galileo, 1998
- Panegyrtes delicatus Galileo & Martins, 1995
- Panegyrtes fasciatus Galileo & Martins, 1995
- Panegyrtes fraternus Galileo & Martins, 1995
- Panegyrtes lactescens Thomson, 1868
- Panegyrtes maculatissimus Galileo & Martins, 1995
- Panegyrtes porosus Galileo & Martins, 1993
- Panegyrtes pseudolactescens Breuning, 1974
- Panegyrtes scutellatus Galileo & Martins, 1995
- Panegyrtes sparsepunctatus Breuning, 1940
- Panegyrtes striatopunctatus Breuning, 1940
- Panegyrtes varicornis Breuning, 1940
