= Panegyrtes porosus =

Scientific classification
- Kingdom: Animalia
- Phylum: Arthropoda
- Class: Insecta
- Order: Coleoptera
- Suborder: Polyphaga
- Infraorder: Cucujiformia
- Family: Cerambycidae
- Genus: Panegyrtes
- Species: P. porosus

Binomial name
- Panegyrtes porosus Galileo & Martins, 1993

Species of beetle

Panegyrtes porosus is a species of beetle in the family Cerambycidae. It was described by Galileo and Martins in 1993. It is known from Colombia and Panama.
