= Sophronisca angolense =

Scientific classification
- Kingdom: Animalia
- Phylum: Arthropoda
- Class: Insecta
- Order: Coleoptera
- Suborder: Polyphaga
- Infraorder: Cucujiformia
- Family: Cerambycidae
- Genus: Sophronisca
- Species: S. angolense

Binomial name
- Sophronisca angolense Lepesme, 1953

Species of beetle

Sophronisca angolense is a species of beetle in the family Cerambycidae. It was described by Lepesme in 1953.
