= Sophronisca grisea =

Scientific classification
- Domain: Eukaryota
- Kingdom: Animalia
- Phylum: Arthropoda
- Class: Insecta
- Order: Coleoptera
- Suborder: Polyphaga
- Infraorder: Cucujiformia
- Family: Cerambycidae
- Genus: Sophronisca
- Species: S. grisea

Binomial name
- Sophronisca grisea Aurivillius, 1910

Species of beetle

Sophronisca grisea is a species of beetle in the family Cerambycidae. It was described by Per Olof Christopher Aurivillius in 1910.

== Subspecies ==
- Sophronisca grisea grisea Aurivillius, 1910
- Sophronisca grisea subannulicornis Breuning, 1968
