= Sophronisca brunnea =

Scientific classification
- Domain: Eukaryota
- Kingdom: Animalia
- Phylum: Arthropoda
- Class: Insecta
- Order: Coleoptera
- Suborder: Polyphaga
- Infraorder: Cucujiformia
- Family: Cerambycidae
- Genus: Sophronisca
- Species: S. brunnea

Binomial name
- Sophronisca brunnea Aurivillius, 1927

Species of beetle

Sophronisca brunnea is a species of beetle in the family Cerambycidae. It was described by Per Olof Christopher Aurivillius in 1927.

== Subspeciea ==
- Sophronisca brunnea atricornis Breuning, 1956
- Sophronisca brunnea brunnea Aurivillius, 1927
