= Sophronisca longula =

Scientific classification
- Kingdom: Animalia
- Phylum: Arthropoda
- Class: Insecta
- Order: Coleoptera
- Suborder: Polyphaga
- Infraorder: Cucujiformia
- Family: Cerambycidae
- Genus: Sophronisca
- Species: S. longula

Binomial name
- Sophronisca longula Breuning, 1964

Species of beetle

Sophronisca longula is a species of beetle in the animal family Cerambycidae. It was described by Stephan von Breuning in 1964.
