= Sophronisca obscura =

Scientific classification
- Kingdom: Animalia
- Phylum: Arthropoda
- Class: Insecta
- Order: Coleoptera
- Suborder: Polyphaga
- Infraorder: Cucujiformia
- Family: Cerambycidae
- Genus: Sophronisca
- Species: S. obscura

Binomial name
- Sophronisca obscura Breuning, 1942

Species of beetle

Sophronisca obscura is a species of beetle in the family Cerambycidae. It was described by Stephan von Breuning in 1942.
