= Sophronisca ruficeps =

Scientific classification
- Kingdom: Animalia
- Phylum: Arthropoda
- Class: Insecta
- Order: Coleoptera
- Suborder: Polyphaga
- Infraorder: Cucujiformia
- Family: Cerambycidae
- Genus: Sophronisca
- Species: S. ruficeps

Binomial name
- Sophronisca ruficeps Breuning, 1954

Species of beetle

Sophronisca ruficeps is a species of beetle in the family Cerambycidae. It was described by Stephan von Breuning in 1954.
