= Sophronisca duprixi =

Scientific classification
- Kingdom: Animalia
- Phylum: Arthropoda
- Class: Insecta
- Order: Coleoptera
- Suborder: Polyphaga
- Infraorder: Cucujiformia
- Family: Cerambycidae
- Genus: Sophronisca
- Species: S. duprixi

Binomial name
- Sophronisca duprixi Lepesme & Breuning, 1955

Species of beetle

Sophronisca duprixi is a species of beetle in the family Cerambycidae. It was described by Lepesme and Stephan von Breuning in 1955.
