= Sophronisca nigra =

Scientific classification
- Kingdom: Animalia
- Phylum: Arthropoda
- Class: Insecta
- Order: Coleoptera
- Suborder: Polyphaga
- Infraorder: Cucujiformia
- Family: Cerambycidae
- Genus: Sophronisca
- Species: S. nigra

Binomial name
- Sophronisca nigra Lepesme & Breuning, 1952

Species of beetle

Sophronisca nigra is a species of beetle in the family Cerambycidae. It was described by Lepesme and Stephan von Breuning in 1952.
