= Sophronisca =

Scientific classification
- Domain: Eukaryota
- Kingdom: Animalia
- Phylum: Arthropoda
- Class: Insecta
- Order: Coleoptera
- Suborder: Polyphaga
- Infraorder: Cucujiformia
- Family: Cerambycidae
- Subfamily: Lamiinae
- Genus: Sophronisca

Genus of beetles

Sophronisca is a genus of longhorn beetles of the subfamily Lamiinae, containing the following species:

- Sophronisca angolense Lepesme, 1953
- Sophronisca annulicornis Breuning, 1942
- Sophronisca brunnea Aurivillius, 1927
- Sophronisca duprixi Lepesme & Breuning, 1955
- Sophronisca elongata Breuning, 1943
- Sophronisca grisea Aurivillius, 1910
- Sophronisca longula Breuning, 1964
- Sophronisca murina Breuning, 1954
- Sophronisca nigra Lepesme & Breuning, 1952
- Sophronisca nigrescens Breuning, 1947
- Sophronisca obscura Breuning, 1942
- Sophronisca ruficeps Breuning, 1954
- Sophronisca rufotarsalis Breuning, 1972
- Sophronisca rufula Breuning, 1954
