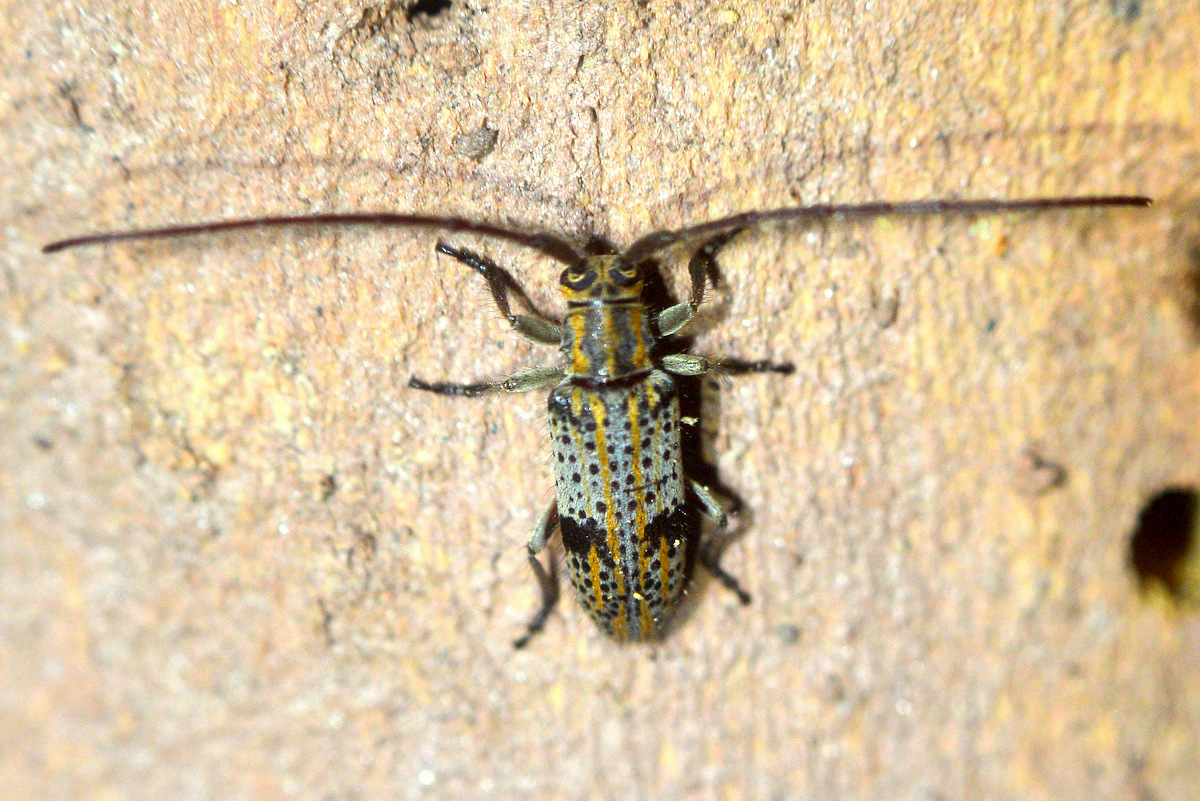

Scientific classification
- Domain: Eukaryota
- Kingdom: Animalia
- Phylum: Arthropoda
- Class: Insecta
- Order: Coleoptera
- Suborder: Polyphaga
- Infraorder: Cucujiformia
- Family: Cerambycidae
- Genus: Unelcus
- Species: U. pictus

Binomial name
- Unelcus pictus Thomson, 1864

= Unelcus pictus =

Species of beetle

Unelcus pictus is a species of beetle in the family Cerambycidae. It was described by Thomson in 1864. It is known from Argentina and Brazil.
