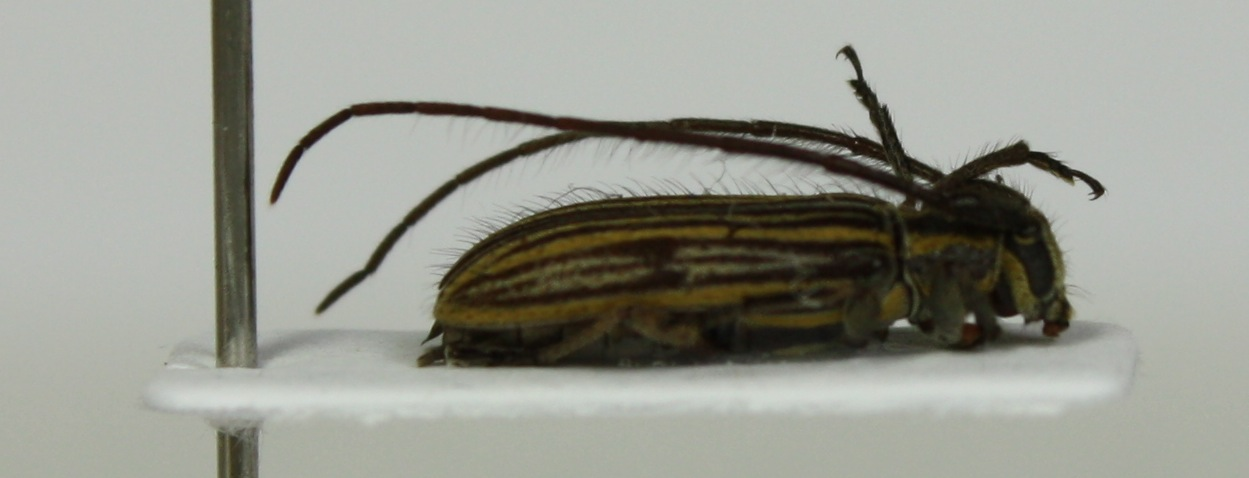

Scientific classification
- Kingdom: Animalia
- Phylum: Arthropoda
- Class: Insecta
- Order: Coleoptera
- Suborder: Polyphaga
- Infraorder: Cucujiformia
- Family: Cerambycidae
- Genus: Unelcus
- Species: U. lineatus

Binomial name
- Unelcus lineatus Bates, 1885

= Unelcus lineatus =

Species of beetle

Unelcus lineatus is a species of beetle in the family Cerambycidae. It was first described by Bates in 1885 and is known to occur in Ecuador, Panama, Mexico, and Venezuela.
