= Unelcus bolivianus =

Scientific classification
- Kingdom: Animalia
- Phylum: Arthropoda
- Clade: Pancrustacea
- Class: Insecta
- Order: Coleoptera
- Suborder: Polyphaga
- Infraorder: Cucujiformia
- Family: Cerambycidae
- Genus: Unelcus
- Species: U. bolivianus

Binomial name
- Unelcus bolivianus Breuning, 1966

Species of beetle

Unelcus bolivianus is a species of beetle in the family Cerambycidae, subfamily Lamiinae and tribe Desmiphorini. It was described by Stephan von Breuning in 1966 and is known from Bolivia where the type locality is in the Cochabamba Department.

The species was described by Breuning in 1966, in the seventeenth part of his series "Nouvelles formes de Lamiaires" published in the ''Bulletin de l'Institut royal des Sciences naturelles de Belgique''. The species description is on page 16. It is placed in the genus Unelcus, in the tribe Desmiphorini.

''Unelcus bolivianus'' is known from Bolivia. Its type locality is in Cochabamba. A 2006 preliminary checklist of Bolivian Cerambycidae lists the species for the country; the only other member of the genus recorded there is Unelcus lineatus Bates, from the department of Santa Cruz.
