= Unelcus =

Scientific classification
- Domain: Eukaryota
- Kingdom: Animalia
- Phylum: Arthropoda
- Class: Insecta
- Order: Coleoptera
- Suborder: Polyphaga
- Infraorder: Cucujiformia
- Family: Cerambycidae
- Tribe: Desmiphorini
- Genus: Unelcus

Genus of beetles

Unelcus is a genus of longhorn beetles of the subfamily Lamiinae, containing the following species:

- Unelcus bolivianus Breuning, 1966
- Unelcus lineatus Bates, 1885
- Unelcus pictus Thomson, 1864
