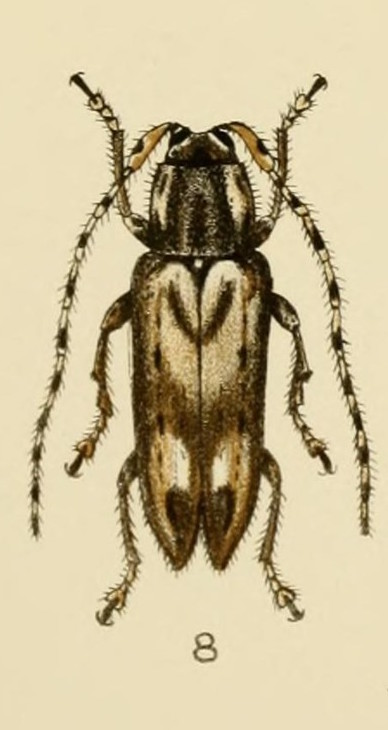
- Sybrinus commixtus

Scientific classification
- Domain: Eukaryota
- Kingdom: Animalia
- Phylum: Arthropoda
- Class: Insecta
- Order: Coleoptera
- Suborder: Polyphaga
- Infraorder: Cucujiformia
- Family: Cerambycidae
- Tribe: Desmiphorini
- Genus: Sybrinus

= Sybrinus =

Genus of beetles

Sybrinus is a genus of longhorn beetles of the subfamily Lamiinae, containing the following species:

subgenus Arabosybrinus

- Sybrinus albosignatus Breuning, 1948
- Sybrinus crassipes Breuning, 1950
- Sybrinus flavescens Breuning, 1948
- Sybrinus grossepunctipennis Breuning, 1950
- Sybrinus persimilis Breuning, 1950

subgenus Sokotrosybrinus

- Sybrinus simonyi Gahan, 1903

subgenus Sybrinus

- Sybrinus commixtus Gahan, 1900
- Sybrinus x-ornatus Téocchi, Jiroux & Sudre, 2007
