= Sybrinus x-ornatus =

Scientific classification
- Domain: Eukaryota
- Kingdom: Animalia
- Phylum: Arthropoda
- Class: Insecta
- Order: Coleoptera
- Suborder: Polyphaga
- Infraorder: Cucujiformia
- Family: Cerambycidae
- Genus: Sybrinus
- Species: S. x-ornatus

Binomial name
- Sybrinus x-ornatus Téocchi, Jiroux & Sudre, 2007

Synonyms
- Sybrinus kabateki Téocchi, Jiroux & Sudre, 2007

Species of beetle

Sybrinus x-ornatus is a species of beetle in the family Cerambycidae. It was described by Téocchi, Jiroux and Sudre in 2007. It is known from Yemen.
