= Sybrinus simonyi =

Scientific classification
- Domain: Eukaryota
- Kingdom: Animalia
- Phylum: Arthropoda
- Class: Insecta
- Order: Coleoptera
- Suborder: Polyphaga
- Infraorder: Cucujiformia
- Family: Cerambycidae
- Genus: Sybrinus
- Species: S. simonyi

Binomial name
- Sybrinus simonyi Gahan, 1903

Synonyms
- Sybrinus albosignatus sokotrensis Téocchi, Jiroux & Sudre, 2004

Species of beetle

Sybrinus simonyi is a species of beetle in the family Cerambycidae. It was described by Gahan in 1903.
