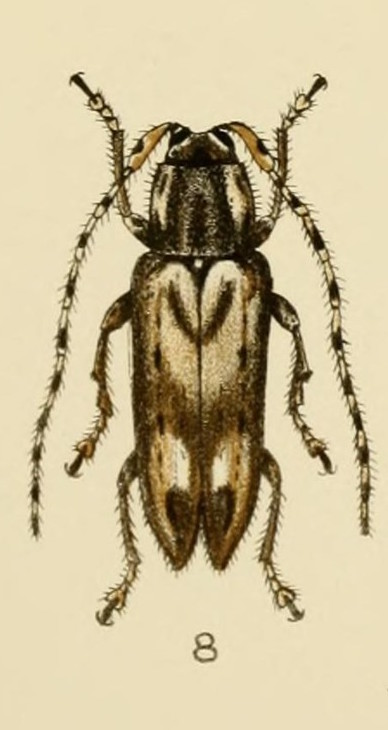

Scientific classification
- Kingdom: Animalia
- Phylum: Arthropoda
- Class: Insecta
- Order: Coleoptera
- Suborder: Polyphaga
- Infraorder: Cucujiformia
- Family: Cerambycidae
- Genus: Sybrinus
- Species: S. commixtus

Binomial name
- Sybrinus commixtus Gahan, 1900

Synonyms
- Sybrinus gahani Aurivillius, 1903

= Sybrinus commixtus =

Species of beetle

Sybrinus commixtus is a species of beetle in the family Cerambycidae. It was described by Gahan in 1900.
