= Penthides modestus =

Scientific classification
- Kingdom: Animalia
- Phylum: Arthropoda
- Class: Insecta
- Order: Coleoptera
- Suborder: Polyphaga
- Infraorder: Cucujiformia
- Family: Cerambycidae
- Genus: Penthides
- Species: P. modestus

Binomial name
- Penthides modestus Tippmann, 1955

Synonyms
- Penthides modesta (Tippmann) (misspelling)

Species of beetle

Penthides modestus is a species of beetle in the family Cerambycidae. It was described by Tippmann in 1955. It is known from China.
