= Penthides rufoflavus =

Scientific classification
- Kingdom: Animalia
- Phylum: Arthropoda
- Class: Insecta
- Order: Coleoptera
- Suborder: Polyphaga
- Infraorder: Cucujiformia
- Family: Cerambycidae
- Genus: Penthides
- Species: P. rufoflavus

Binomial name
- Penthides rufoflavus (Hayashi, 1957)

Synonyms
- Hirakura rufoflava Hayashi, 1957; Penthides flavus (Matsushita) Hayashi, 1963

Species of beetle

Penthides rufoflavus is a species of beetle in the family Cerambycidae. It was described by Hayashi in 1957, originally under the genus Hirakura. It is known from Japan.
