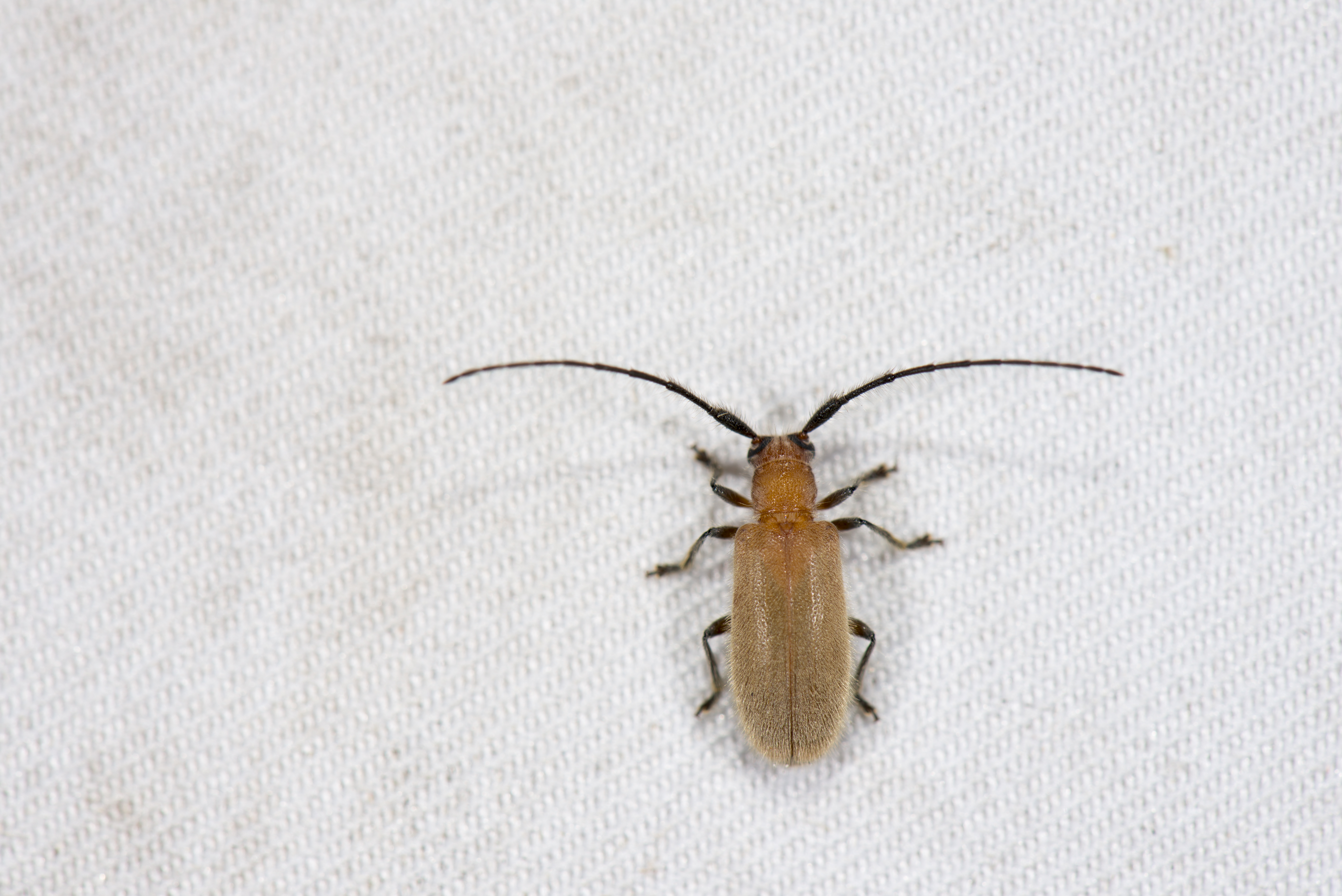
- Penthides flavus

Scientific classification
- Kingdom: Animalia
- Phylum: Arthropoda
- Class: Insecta
- Order: Coleoptera
- Suborder: Polyphaga
- Infraorder: Cucujiformia
- Family: Cerambycidae
- Tribe: Desmiphorini
- Genus: Penthides

= Penthides =

Genus of beetles

Penthides is a genus of longhorn beetles of the subfamily Lamiinae, containing the following species:

- Penthides anilis Holzschuh, 2010
- Penthides flavus Matsushita, 1933
- Penthides modestus Tippmann, 1955
- Penthides rufoflavus (Hayashi, 1957)
