= Penthides anilis =

Scientific classification
- Kingdom: Animalia
- Phylum: Arthropoda
- Class: Insecta
- Order: Coleoptera
- Suborder: Polyphaga
- Infraorder: Cucujiformia
- Family: Cerambycidae
- Genus: Penthides
- Species: P. anilis

Binomial name
- Penthides anilis Holzschuh, 2010

Species of beetle

Penthides anilis is a species of beetles in the Cerambycidae family. It was described by Holzschuh in 2010.
