= Penthides flavus =

Scientific classification
- Kingdom: Animalia
- Phylum: Arthropoda
- Class: Insecta
- Order: Coleoptera
- Suborder: Polyphaga
- Infraorder: Cucujiformia
- Family: Cerambycidae
- Genus: Penthides
- Species: P. flavus

Binomial name
- Penthides flavus Matsushita, 1933

Species of beetle

Penthides flavus is a species of beetle in the family Cerambycidae. It was described by Matsushita in 1933. It is known from Taiwan and Japan.

== Subspecies ==
- Penthides flavus flavus Matsushita, 1933
- Penthides flavus multipubens Makihara, 1978
