= Diadelioides camerunensis =

Scientific classification
- Kingdom: Animalia
- Phylum: Arthropoda
- Class: Insecta
- Order: Coleoptera
- Suborder: Polyphaga
- Infraorder: Cucujiformia
- Family: Cerambycidae
- Genus: Diadelioides
- Species: D. camerunensis

Binomial name
- Diadelioides camerunensis Breuning, 1942

Species of beetle

Diadelioides camerunensis is a species of beetle in the family Cerambycidae. It was described by Breuning in 1942.
