= Diadelioides =

Scientific classification
- Kingdom: Animalia
- Phylum: Arthropoda
- Class: Insecta
- Order: Coleoptera
- Suborder: Polyphaga
- Infraorder: Cucujiformia
- Family: Cerambycidae
- Subfamily: Lamiinae
- Tribe: Desmiphorini
- Genus: Diadelioides; Breuning, 1940

Genus of beetles

Diadelioides is a genus of longhorn beetles of the subfamily Lamiinae, containing the following species:

- Diadelioides bipunctatus Breuning, 1940
- Diadelioides camerunensis Breuning, 1942
- Diadelioides crassepuncta Breuning, 1940
- Diadelioides exiguus Breuning, 1943
- Diadelioides ghesquierei Breuning, 1952
- Diadelioides glabricollis Breuning, 1947
- Diadelioides lateraliplagiatus Breuning, 1940
- Diadelioides minor Breuning, 1940
- Diadelioides similis Breuning, 1940
- Diadelioides strandi Breuning, 1940
- Diadelioides unicolor Breuning, 1940
