= Diadelioides ghesquierei =

Scientific classification
- Kingdom: Animalia
- Phylum: Arthropoda
- Class: Insecta
- Order: Coleoptera
- Suborder: Polyphaga
- Infraorder: Cucujiformia
- Family: Cerambycidae
- Genus: Diadelioides
- Species: D. ghesquierei

Binomial name
- Diadelioides ghesquierei Breuning, 1952

Species of beetle

Diadelioides ghesquierei is a species of beetle in the family Cerambycidae. It was described by Breuning in 1952.
