= Diadelioides glabricollis =

Scientific classification
- Kingdom: Animalia
- Phylum: Arthropoda
- Class: Insecta
- Order: Coleoptera
- Suborder: Polyphaga
- Infraorder: Cucujiformia
- Family: Cerambycidae
- Genus: Diadelioides
- Species: D. glabricollis

Binomial name
- Diadelioides glabricollis Breuning, 1947

Species of beetle

Diadelioides glabricollis is a beetle species in the Cerambycidae family. It was described by Breuning in 1947.
