= Estolomimus distinctus =

Scientific classification
- Kingdom: Animalia
- Phylum: Arthropoda
- Class: Insecta
- Order: Coleoptera
- Suborder: Polyphaga
- Infraorder: Cucujiformia
- Family: Cerambycidae
- Genus: Estolomimus
- Species: E. distinctus

Binomial name
- Estolomimus distinctus Martins & Galileo, 1997

Species of beetle

Estolomimus distinctus is a species of beetle in the family Cerambycidae. It was described by Martins and Galileo in 1997. It is known from Brazil.
