= Estolomimus maculatus =

Scientific classification
- Kingdom: Animalia
- Phylum: Arthropoda
- Class: Insecta
- Order: Coleoptera
- Suborder: Polyphaga
- Infraorder: Cucujiformia
- Family: Cerambycidae
- Genus: Estolomimus
- Species: E. maculatus

Binomial name
- Estolomimus maculatus Martins & Galileo, 2002

Species of beetle

Estolomimus maculatus is a species of beetle in the family Cerambycidae. It was described by Martins and Galileo in 2002. It is known from Brazil.
