= Estolomimus =

Scientific classification
- Kingdom: Animalia
- Phylum: Arthropoda
- Class: Insecta
- Order: Coleoptera
- Suborder: Polyphaga
- Infraorder: Cucujiformia
- Family: Cerambycidae
- Subfamily: Lamiinae
- Tribe: Desmiphorini
- Genus: Estolomimus; Breuning, 1940

Genus of beetles

Estolomimus is a genus of longhorn beetles of the subfamily Lamiinae, containing the following species:

- Estolomimus abjunctus Martins & Galileo, 2002
- Estolomimus apicale Martins & Galileo, 1997
- Estolomimus curtus (Breuning, 1940)
- Estolomimus distinctus Martins & Galileo, 1997
- Estolomimus lichenophorus Martins & Galileo, 2002
- Estolomimus maculatus Martins & Galileo, 2002
- Estolomimus marmoratus Breuning, 1940
- Estolomimus pulvereus Martins & Galileo, 1997
- Estolomimus solidus (Breuning, 1940)
- Estolomimus transversus Martins & Galileo, 2002
