= Phlyarus =

Scientific classification
- Kingdom: Animalia
- Phylum: Arthropoda
- Class: Insecta
- Order: Coleoptera
- Suborder: Polyphaga
- Infraorder: Cucujiformia
- Family: Cerambycidae
- Tribe: Desmiphorini
- Genus: Phlyarus

Genus of beetles

Phlyarus is a genus of longhorn beetles of the subfamily Lamiinae, containing the following species:

subgenus Bulbophlyarus

- Phlyarus basirufipennis Breuning, 1961
- Phlyarus bulbicollis Breuning, 1951
- Phlyarus thailandensis Breuning & Chujo, 1966

subgenus Phlyarus

- Phlyarus basalis Pascoe, 1858
- Phlyarus cristatus Gahan, 1907
- Phlyarus microspinicollis Breuning, 1963
- Phlyarus multicarinipennis Breuning, 1965
- Phlyarus rufoscapus Breuning, 1976

subgenus Tuberophlyarus

- Phlyarus tubericollis Breuning, 1967
