= Phlyarus cristatus =

Scientific classification
- Kingdom: Animalia
- Phylum: Arthropoda
- Class: Insecta
- Order: Coleoptera
- Suborder: Polyphaga
- Infraorder: Cucujiformia
- Family: Cerambycidae
- Genus: Phlyarus
- Species: P. cristatus

Binomial name
- Phlyarus cristatus Gahan, 1907

Species of beetle

Phlyarus cristatus is a species of beetle in the family Cerambycidae. It was described by Gahan in 1907. It is known from Sumatra.
