= Phlyarus rufoscapus =

Scientific classification
- Kingdom: Animalia
- Phylum: Arthropoda
- Class: Insecta
- Order: Coleoptera
- Suborder: Polyphaga
- Infraorder: Cucujiformia
- Family: Cerambycidae
- Genus: Phlyarus
- Species: P. rufoscapus

Binomial name
- Phlyarus rufoscapus Breuning, 1976

Species of beetle

Phlyarus rufoscapus is a species of beetle in the family Cerambycidae. It was described by Stephan von Breuning in 1976. It is known from Vietnam.
