= Phlyarus basalis =

Scientific classification
- Kingdom: Animalia
- Phylum: Arthropoda
- Class: Insecta
- Order: Coleoptera
- Suborder: Polyphaga
- Infraorder: Cucujiformia
- Family: Cerambycidae
- Genus: Phlyarus
- Species: P. basalis

Binomial name
- Phlyarus basalis Pascoe, 1858

Species of beetle

Phlyarus basalis is a species of beetle in the family Cerambycidae. It was described by Pascoe in 1858. It is known from Borneo and Malaysia.
