= Phlyarus tubericollis =

Scientific classification
- Kingdom: Animalia
- Phylum: Arthropoda
- Class: Insecta
- Order: Coleoptera
- Suborder: Polyphaga
- Infraorder: Cucujiformia
- Family: Cerambycidae
- Genus: Phlyarus
- Species: P. tubericollis

Binomial name
- Phlyarus tubericollis Breuning, 1967

Species of beetle

Phlyarus tubericollis is a species of beetle in the family Cerambycidae. It was described by Stephan von Breuning in 1967. It is known from Borneo.
