= Phlyarus thailandensis =

Scientific classification
- Kingdom: Animalia
- Phylum: Arthropoda
- Class: Insecta
- Order: Coleoptera
- Suborder: Polyphaga
- Infraorder: Cucujiformia
- Family: Cerambycidae
- Genus: Phlyarus
- Species: P. thailandensis

Binomial name
- Phlyarus thailandensis Breuning & Chujo, 1966

Species of beetle

Phlyarus thailandensis is a species of beetle in the family Cerambycidae. It was described by Breuning and Chujo in 1966. It is known from Thailand.
