= Phlyarus bulbicollis =

Scientific classification
- Kingdom: Animalia
- Phylum: Arthropoda
- Class: Insecta
- Order: Coleoptera
- Suborder: Polyphaga
- Infraorder: Cucujiformia
- Family: Cerambycidae
- Genus: Phlyarus
- Species: P. bulbicollis

Binomial name
- Phlyarus bulbicollis Breuning, 1951

Synonyms
- Bulbophlyarus bulbicollis Breuning, 1951

Species of beetle

Phlyarus bulbicollis is a species of beetle in the family Cerambycidae. It was described by Stephan von Breuning in 1951. It is known from Indonesia.
