= Phlyarus multicarinipennis =

Scientific classification
- Kingdom: Animalia
- Phylum: Arthropoda
- Class: Insecta
- Order: Coleoptera
- Suborder: Polyphaga
- Infraorder: Cucujiformia
- Family: Cerambycidae
- Genus: Phlyarus
- Species: P. multicarinipennis

Binomial name
- Phlyarus multicarinipennis Breuning, 1965

Species of beetle

Phlyarus multicarinipennis is a species of beetle in the family Cerambycidae. It was described by Stephan von Breuning in 1965. It is known from Malaysia.
