= Hoplorana =

Scientific classification
- Kingdom: Animalia
- Phylum: Arthropoda
- Class: Insecta
- Order: Coleoptera
- Suborder: Polyphaga
- Infraorder: Cucujiformia
- Family: Cerambycidae
- Subfamily: Lamiinae
- Tribe: Desmiphorini
- Genus: Hoplorana; Fairmaire, 1896

Genus of beetles

Hoplorana is a genus of longhorn beetles of the subfamily Lamiinae, containing the following species:

subgenus Hoplorana

- Hoplorana attenuata Fairmaire, 1898
- Hoplorana fuscovestita Breuning, 1970
- Hoplorana mussardi Breuning, 1957
- Hoplorana parterufa Breuning, 1980
- Hoplorana quadricristata Fairmaire, 1896
- Hoplorana vadoni Breuning, 1957

subgenus Parhoplorana

- Hoplorana nigroscutata Fairmaire, 1905
