= Hoplorana quadricristata =

Scientific classification
- Kingdom: Animalia
- Phylum: Arthropoda
- Class: Insecta
- Order: Coleoptera
- Suborder: Polyphaga
- Infraorder: Cucujiformia
- Family: Cerambycidae
- Genus: Hoplorana
- Species: H. quadricristata

Binomial name
- Hoplorana quadricristata Fairmaire, 1896

Species of beetle

Hoplorana quadricristata is a species of beetle in the family Cerambycidae. It was described by Fairmaire in 1896. It is known from Madagascar.
