= Hoplorana nigroscutata =

Scientific classification
- Kingdom: Animalia
- Phylum: Arthropoda
- Class: Insecta
- Order: Coleoptera
- Suborder: Polyphaga
- Infraorder: Cucujiformia
- Family: Cerambycidae
- Genus: Hoplorana
- Species: H. nigroscutata

Binomial name
- Hoplorana nigroscutata Fairmaire, 1905

Species of beetle

Hoplorana nigroscutata is a species of beetle in the family Cerambycidae. It was described by Fairmaire in 1905. It is known from Madagascar.
