= Hoplorana attenuata =

Scientific classification
- Kingdom: Animalia
- Phylum: Arthropoda
- Class: Insecta
- Order: Coleoptera
- Suborder: Polyphaga
- Infraorder: Cucujiformia
- Family: Cerambycidae
- Genus: Hoplorana
- Species: H. attenuata

Binomial name
- Hoplorana attenuata Fairmaire, 1898

Species of beetle

Hoplorana attenuata is a species of beetle in the family Cerambycidae. It was described by Fairmaire in 1898. It is known from Madagascar.
