= Stereomerus =

Scientific classification
- Kingdom: Animalia
- Phylum: Arthropoda
- Class: Insecta
- Order: Coleoptera
- Suborder: Polyphaga
- Infraorder: Cucujiformia
- Family: Cerambycidae
- Tribe: Desmiphorini
- Genus: Stereomerus

Genus of beetles

Stereomerus is a genus of longhorn beetles of the subfamily Lamiinae, containing the following species:

- Stereomerus brachypterus Martins & Galileo, 1994
- Stereomerus diadelus Martins & Galileo, 1994
- Stereomerus hovorei Martins & Galileo, 2006
- Stereomerus lineatus (Breuning, 1940)
- Stereomerus maculatus Galileo & Martins, 2003
- Stereomerus melzeri Martins & Galileo, 1994
- Stereomerus pachypezoides Melzer, 1934
