= Stereomerus brachypterus =

Scientific classification
- Kingdom: Animalia
- Phylum: Arthropoda
- Class: Insecta
- Order: Coleoptera
- Suborder: Polyphaga
- Infraorder: Cucujiformia
- Family: Cerambycidae
- Genus: Stereomerus
- Species: S. brachypterus

Binomial name
- Stereomerus brachypterus Martins & Galileo, 1994

Species of beetle

Stereomerus brachypterus is a species of beetle in the family Cerambycidae. It was described by Martins and Galileo in 1994. It is known from Brazil.
