= Stereomerus pachypezoides =

Scientific classification
- Kingdom: Animalia
- Phylum: Arthropoda
- Class: Insecta
- Order: Coleoptera
- Suborder: Polyphaga
- Infraorder: Cucujiformia
- Family: Cerambycidae
- Genus: Stereomerus
- Species: S. pachypezoides

Binomial name
- Stereomerus pachypezoides Melzer, 1934

Species of beetle

Stereomerus pachypezoides is a species of beetle in the family Cerambycidae. It was described by Melzer in 1934. It is known from Argentina, Brazil and Uruguay.
