= Stereomerus maculatus =

Scientific classification
- Kingdom: Animalia
- Phylum: Arthropoda
- Class: Insecta
- Order: Coleoptera
- Suborder: Polyphaga
- Infraorder: Cucujiformia
- Family: Cerambycidae
- Genus: Stereomerus
- Species: S. maculatus

Binomial name
- Stereomerus maculatus Galileo & Martins, 2003

Species of beetle

Stereomerus maculatus is a species of beetle in the family Cerambycidae. It was described by Galileo and Martins in 2003. It is known from Brazil.
