= Stereomerus hovorei =

Scientific classification
- Kingdom: Animalia
- Phylum: Arthropoda
- Class: Insecta
- Order: Coleoptera
- Suborder: Polyphaga
- Infraorder: Cucujiformia
- Family: Cerambycidae
- Genus: Stereomerus
- Species: S. hovorei

Binomial name
- Stereomerus hovorei Martins & Galileo, 2006

Species of beetle

Stereomerus hovorei is a species of beetle in the family Cerambycidae. It was described by Martins and Galileo in 2006. It is known from western Ecuador.
