= Illaena =

Scientific classification
- Domain: Eukaryota
- Kingdom: Animalia
- Phylum: Arthropoda
- Class: Insecta
- Order: Coleoptera
- Suborder: Polyphaga
- Infraorder: Cucujiformia
- Family: Cerambycidae
- Tribe: Desmiphorini
- Genus: Illaena

Genus of beetles

Illaena is a genus of longhorn beetles of the subfamily Lamiinae, containing the following species:

- Illaena albertisi Breuning, 1956
- Illaena dawsoni Breuning, 1970
- Illaena exigua (Gahan, 1893)
- Illaena exilis Erichson, 1842
- Illaena nigrina (Pascoe, 1866)
- Illaena occidentalis Breuning, 1974
