= Illaena exilis =

Scientific classification
- Kingdom: Animalia
- Phylum: Arthropoda
- Class: Insecta
- Order: Coleoptera
- Suborder: Polyphaga
- Infraorder: Cucujiformia
- Family: Cerambycidae
- Genus: Illaena
- Species: I. exilis

Binomial name
- Illaena exilis Erichson, 1842

Species of beetle

Illaena exilis is a species of beetle in the family Cerambycidae. It was described by Wilhelm Ferdinand Erichson in 1842. It is known from Australia.
