= Illaena exigua =

Scientific classification
- Domain: Eukaryota
- Kingdom: Animalia
- Phylum: Arthropoda
- Class: Insecta
- Order: Coleoptera
- Suborder: Polyphaga
- Infraorder: Cucujiformia
- Family: Cerambycidae
- Genus: Illaena
- Species: I. exigua

Binomial name
- Illaena exigua (Gahan, 1893)

Synonyms
- Allomicrus exiguus Gahan, 1893; Allomicrus exiguous Gahan, 1893 (misspelling); Illaena exiguus (Gahan, 1893) (misspelling)

Species of beetle

Illaena exigua is a species of beetle in the family Cerambycidae. It was described by Gahan in 1893. It is known from Australia.
