= Neissa nigrina =

Scientific classification
- Kingdom: Animalia
- Phylum: Arthropoda
- Class: Insecta
- Order: Coleoptera
- Suborder: Polyphaga
- Infraorder: Cucujiformia
- Family: Cerambycidae
- Genus: Neissa
- Species: N. nigrina

Binomial name
- Neissa nigrina (Pascoe, 1866)

Synonyms
- Illaena nigrina (Pascoe, 1866)

Species of beetle

Neissa nigrina is a species of beetle in the family Cerambycidae. It was described by Pascoe in 1866. It is known from Australia.
