= Neissa occidentalis =

Scientific classification
- Kingdom: Animalia
- Phylum: Arthropoda
- Class: Insecta
- Order: Coleoptera
- Suborder: Polyphaga
- Infraorder: Cucujiformia
- Family: Cerambycidae
- Genus: Neissa
- Species: N. occidentalis

Binomial name
- Neissa occidentalis Breuning, 1974

Synonyms
- Illaena occidentalis Breuning, 1974

Species of beetle

Neissa occidentalis is a species of beetle in the family Cerambycidae. It was described by Stephan von Breuning in 1974. It is known from Australia.
