= Neissa albertisi =

Scientific classification
- Kingdom: Animalia
- Phylum: Arthropoda
- Class: Insecta
- Order: Coleoptera
- Suborder: Polyphaga
- Infraorder: Cucujiformia
- Family: Cerambycidae
- Genus: Neissa
- Species: N. albertisi

Binomial name
- Neissa albertisi (Breuning, 1956)

Synonyms
- Illaena albertisi Breuning, 1956

Species of beetle

Neissa albertisi is a species of beetle in the family Cerambycidae. It was described by Stephan von Breuning in 1956. It is known from Australia.
