= Pilomecyna serieguttata =

Scientific classification
- Kingdom: Animalia
- Phylum: Arthropoda
- Class: Insecta
- Order: Coleoptera
- Suborder: Polyphaga
- Infraorder: Cucujiformia
- Family: Cerambycidae
- Genus: Pilomecyna
- Species: P. serieguttata

Binomial name
- Pilomecyna serieguttata (Fairmaire, 1899)

Species of beetle

Pilomecyna serieguttata is a species of beetle in the family Cerambycidae. It was described by Fairmaire in 1899.
