= Pilomecyna =

Scientific classification
- Domain: Eukaryota
- Kingdom: Animalia
- Phylum: Arthropoda
- Class: Insecta
- Order: Coleoptera
- Suborder: Polyphaga
- Infraorder: Cucujiformia
- Family: Cerambycidae
- Tribe: Desmiphorini
- Genus: Pilomecyna

Genus of beetles

Pilomecyna is a genus of longhorn beetles of the subfamily Lamiinae, containing the following species:

- Pilomecyna excavata Breuning, 1940
- Pilomecyna flavolineata Breuning, 1957
- Pilomecyna griseolineata Breuning, 1957
- Pilomecyna grisescens Breuning, 1980
- Pilomecyna longeantennata Breuning, 1942
- Pilomecyna serieguttata (Fairmaire, 1899)
