= Pilomecyna longeantennata =

Scientific classification
- Kingdom: Animalia
- Phylum: Arthropoda
- Class: Insecta
- Order: Coleoptera
- Suborder: Polyphaga
- Infraorder: Cucujiformia
- Family: Cerambycidae
- Genus: Pilomecyna
- Species: P. longeantennata

Binomial name
- Pilomecyna longeantennata Breuning, 1942

Species of beetle

Pilomecyna longeantennata is a species of beetle in the family Cerambycidae. It was described by Stephan von Breuning in 1942.
