= Pilomecyna griseolineata =

Scientific classification
- Kingdom: Animalia
- Phylum: Arthropoda
- Class: Insecta
- Order: Coleoptera
- Suborder: Polyphaga
- Infraorder: Cucujiformia
- Family: Cerambycidae
- Genus: Pilomecyna
- Species: P. griseolineata

Binomial name
- Pilomecyna griseolineata Breuning, 1957

Species of beetle

Pilomecyna griseolineata is a species of beetle in the family Cerambycidae. It was described by Stephan von Breuning in 1957.

== Subspecies ==
- Pilomecyna griseolineata griseolineata Breuning, 1957
- Pilomecyna griseolineata uniformis Breuning, 1957
