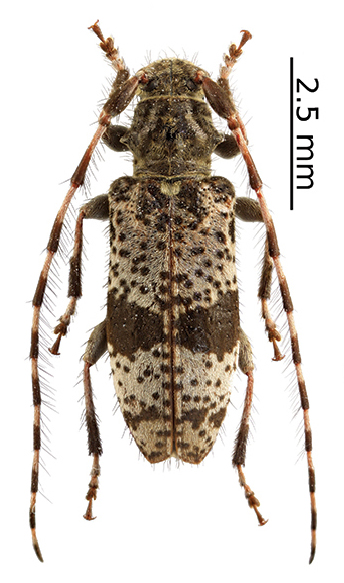

Scientific classification
- Kingdom: Animalia
- Phylum: Arthropoda
- Class: Insecta
- Order: Coleoptera
- Suborder: Polyphaga
- Infraorder: Cucujiformia
- Family: Cerambycidae
- Genus: Rhopaloscelis
- Species: R. unifasciatus

Binomial name
- Rhopaloscelis unifasciatus Blessig, 1873

= Rhopaloscelis unifasciatus =

Species of beetle

Rhopaloscelis unifasciatus is a species of beetle in the family Cerambycidae. It was described by Blessig in 1873. It is known from Mongolia, Russia, China, Japan, North Korea, and Kazakhstan.
