= Rhopaloscelis maculatus =

Scientific classification
- Kingdom: Animalia
- Phylum: Arthropoda
- Class: Insecta
- Order: Coleoptera
- Suborder: Polyphaga
- Infraorder: Cucujiformia
- Family: Cerambycidae
- Genus: Rhopaloscelis
- Species: R. maculatus

Binomial name
- Rhopaloscelis maculatus Bates, 1877

Synonyms
- Clytosemia apicalis (Pic) Matsushita, 1943; Clytosemia kuwayamana Kano, 1933; Clytosemia pulchra var. kuwayamana (Kano) Mitono, 1940

Species of beetle

Rhopaloscelis maculatus is a species of beetle in the family Cerambycidae. It was described by Henry Walter Bates in 1877.
