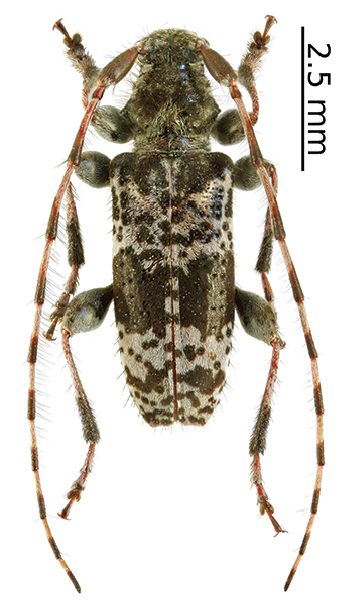
- Rhopaloscelis unifasciatus (male)

Scientific classification
- Kingdom: Animalia
- Phylum: Arthropoda
- Class: Insecta
- Order: Coleoptera
- Suborder: Polyphaga
- Infraorder: Cucujiformia
- Family: Cerambycidae
- Tribe: Desmiphorini
- Genus: Rhopaloscelis

= Rhopaloscelis =

Genus of beetles

Rhopaloscelis is a genus of longhorn beetles of the subfamily Lamiinae, containing the following species:

- Rhopaloscelis maculatus Bates, 1877
- Rhopaloscelis schurmanni Breuning, 1969
- Rhopaloscelis unifasciatus Blessig, 1873

Size: average 2.5mm
