= Rhopaloscelis schurmanni =

Scientific classification
- Kingdom: Animalia
- Phylum: Arthropoda
- Class: Insecta
- Order: Coleoptera
- Suborder: Polyphaga
- Infraorder: Cucujiformia
- Family: Cerambycidae
- Genus: Rhopaloscelis
- Species: R. schurmanni

Binomial name
- Rhopaloscelis schurmanni Breuning, 1969

Synonyms
- Rhopaloscelis schuberti Breuning, 1975 (misspelling)

Species of beetle

Rhopaloscelis schurmanni is a species of beetle in the family Cerambycidae. It was described by Stephan von Breuning in 1969.
