= Eugrapheus spinipennis =

Scientific classification
- Kingdom: Animalia
- Phylum: Arthropoda
- Class: Insecta
- Order: Coleoptera
- Suborder: Polyphaga
- Infraorder: Cucujiformia
- Family: Cerambycidae
- Genus: Eugrapheus
- Species: E. spinipennis

Binomial name
- Eugrapheus spinipennis Breuning, 1970

Species of beetle

Eugrapheus spinipennis is a species of beetle in the family Cerambycidae. It was described by Stephan von Breuning in 1970.
