= Eugrapheus =

Scientific classification
- Kingdom: Animalia
- Phylum: Arthropoda
- Class: Insecta
- Order: Coleoptera
- Suborder: Polyphaga
- Infraorder: Cucujiformia
- Family: Cerambycidae
- Subfamily: Lamiinae
- Tribe: Desmiphorini
- Genus: Eugrapheus; Fairmaire, 1896

Genus of beetles

Eugrapheus is a genus of longhorn beetles of the subfamily Lamiinae, containing the following species:

- Eugrapheus curtescapus Breuning, 1970
- Eugrapheus lineellus Fairmaire, 1896
- Eugrapheus longehamatus Fairmaire, 1897
- Eugrapheus perroti Breuning, 1957
- Eugrapheus spinipennis Breuning, 1970
- Eugrapheus vitticollis Breuning, 1957
