= Eugrapheus lineellus =

Scientific classification
- Kingdom: Animalia
- Phylum: Arthropoda
- Class: Insecta
- Order: Coleoptera
- Suborder: Polyphaga
- Infraorder: Cucujiformia
- Family: Cerambycidae
- Genus: Eugrapheus
- Species: E. lineellus

Binomial name
- Eugrapheus lineellus Fairmaire, 1896

Species of beetle

Eugrapheus lineellus is a species of beetle in the family Cerambycidae. It was described by Fairmaire in 1896.
