= Pseudoterinaea =

Scientific classification
- Kingdom: Animalia
- Phylum: Arthropoda
- Class: Insecta
- Order: Coleoptera
- Suborder: Polyphaga
- Infraorder: Cucujiformia
- Family: Cerambycidae
- Tribe: Desmiphorini
- Genus: Pseudoterinaea

Genus of beetles

Pseudoterinaea is a genus of longhorn beetles of the subfamily Lamiinae, containing the following species:

- Pseudoterinaea bicoloripes (Pic, 1926)
- Pseudoterinaea densepunctata (Breuning, 1954)
- Pseudoterinaea indica Breuning, 1940
- Pseudoterinaea nigerrima Breuning, 1964
- Pseudoterinaea seticornis (Gressitt, 1940)
