= Pseudoterinaea bicoloripes =

Scientific classification
- Kingdom: Animalia
- Phylum: Arthropoda
- Class: Insecta
- Order: Coleoptera
- Suborder: Polyphaga
- Infraorder: Cucujiformia
- Family: Cerambycidae
- Genus: Pseudoterinaea
- Species: P. bicoloripes

Binomial name
- Pseudoterinaea bicoloripes (Pic, 1926)

Synonyms
- Desisa (Cylindrostyrax) laosensis Breuning, 1965; Phesates marmoratus Gressitt, 1940; Pseudanaesthetis bicoloripes Pic, 1926; Pseudanaesthetis bicoloripes Pic, 1944 nec 1926

Species of beetle

Pseudoterinaea bicoloripes is a species of beetle in the family Cerambycidae. It was described by Maurice Pic in 1926.
