= Pseudoterinaea densepunctata =

Scientific classification
- Kingdom: Animalia
- Phylum: Arthropoda
- Class: Insecta
- Order: Coleoptera
- Suborder: Polyphaga
- Infraorder: Cucujiformia
- Family: Cerambycidae
- Genus: Pseudoterinaea
- Species: P. densepunctata

Binomial name
- Pseudoterinaea densepunctata (Breuning, 1954)

Synonyms
- Pseudanaestethis densepunctata Breuning, 1954

Species of beetle

Pseudoterinaea densepunctata is a species of beetle in the family Cerambycidae. It was described by Stephan von Breuning in 1954.
