= Pseudoterinaea seticornis =

Scientific classification
- Kingdom: Animalia
- Phylum: Arthropoda
- Class: Insecta
- Order: Coleoptera
- Suborder: Polyphaga
- Infraorder: Cucujiformia
- Family: Cerambycidae
- Genus: Pseudoterinaea
- Species: P. seticornis

Binomial name
- Pseudoterinaea seticornis (Gressitt, 1940)

Species of beetle

Pseudoterinaea seticornis is a species of beetle in the family Cerambycidae. It was described by Gressitt in 1940.
