= Nedine spaethi =

Scientific classification
- Kingdom: Animalia
- Phylum: Arthropoda
- Class: Insecta
- Order: Coleoptera
- Suborder: Polyphaga
- Infraorder: Cucujiformia
- Family: Cerambycidae
- Genus: Nedine
- Species: N. spaethi

Binomial name
- Nedine spaethi (Heller, 1924)

Synonyms
- Parazygocera spaethi Heller, 1924

Species of beetle

Nedine spaethi is a species of beetle in the family Cerambycidae. It was described by Heller in 1924, and is combined with the genus Nedine ranked in the tribe Desmiphorini.
