= Nedine =

Scientific classification
- Kingdom: Animalia
- Phylum: Arthropoda
- Class: Insecta
- Order: Coleoptera
- Suborder: Polyphaga
- Infraorder: Cucujiformia
- Family: Cerambycidae
- Tribe: Desmiphorini
- Genus: Nedine

Genus of beetles

Nedine is a genus of longhorn beetles of the subfamily Lamiinae, containing the following species:

- Nedine adversa (Pascoe, 1864)
- Nedine longipes J. Thomson, 1864
- Nedine spaethi (Heller, 1924)
- Nedine sparatis Wang & Chiang, 1999
- Nedine subspinosa Wang & Chiang, 1999
