= Nedine sparatis =

Scientific classification
- Kingdom: Animalia
- Phylum: Arthropoda
- Class: Insecta
- Order: Coleoptera
- Suborder: Polyphaga
- Infraorder: Cucujiformia
- Family: Cerambycidae
- Genus: Nedine
- Species: N. sparatis

Binomial name
- Nedine sparatis Wang & Chiang, 1999

Species of beetle

Nedine sparatis is a species of beetle in the family Cerambycidae. It was described by Wang and Chiang in 1999.
