= Nedine adversa =

Scientific classification
- Kingdom: Animalia
- Phylum: Arthropoda
- Clade: Pancrustacea
- Class: Insecta
- Order: Coleoptera
- Suborder: Polyphaga
- Infraorder: Cucujiformia
- Family: Cerambycidae
- Genus: Nedine
- Species: N. adversa

Binomial name
- Nedine adversa (Pascoe, 1864)

Synonyms
- Opsioleus adversus Pascoe, 1864; Parazygocera flavolineata Breuning, 1943

Species of beetle

Nedine adversa is a species of beetle in the family Cerambycidae. It was described by Pascoe in 1864. It is known from Java, Malaysia, Borneo and Sumatra.
