= Nedine longipes =

Scientific classification
- Kingdom: Animalia
- Phylum: Arthropoda
- Class: Insecta
- Order: Coleoptera
- Suborder: Polyphaga
- Infraorder: Cucujiformia
- Family: Cerambycidae
- Genus: Nedine
- Species: N. longipes

Binomial name
- Nedine longipes J. Thomson, 1864

Species of beetle

Nedine longipes is a species of beetle in the family Cerambycidae. It was described by J. Thomson in 1864.
