= Pterolophioides laterifuscus =

Scientific classification
- Kingdom: Animalia
- Phylum: Arthropoda
- Class: Insecta
- Order: Coleoptera
- Suborder: Polyphaga
- Infraorder: Cucujiformia
- Family: Cerambycidae
- Genus: Pterolophioides
- Species: P. laterifuscus

Binomial name
- Pterolophioides laterifuscus (Fairmaire, 1886)

Species of beetle

Pterolophioides laterifuscus is a species of beetle in the family Cerambycidae. It was described by Fairmaire in 1886.
