= Pterolophioides guineensis =

Scientific classification
- Kingdom: Animalia
- Phylum: Arthropoda
- Clade: Pancrustacea
- Class: Insecta
- Order: Coleoptera
- Suborder: Polyphaga
- Infraorder: Cucujiformia
- Family: Cerambycidae
- Genus: Pterolophioides
- Species: P. guineensis

Binomial name
- Pterolophioides guineensis Breuning, 1955

Species of beetle

Pterolophioides guineensis is a species of beetle in the family Cerambycidae. It was described by Stephan von Breuning in 1955.
