= Pterolophioides subunicolor =

Scientific classification
- Kingdom: Animalia
- Phylum: Arthropoda
- Class: Insecta
- Order: Coleoptera
- Suborder: Polyphaga
- Infraorder: Cucujiformia
- Family: Cerambycidae
- Genus: Pterolophioides
- Species: P. subunicolor

Binomial name
- Pterolophioides subunicolor Breuning, 1969

Species of beetle

Pterolophioides subunicolor is a species of beetle in the family Cerambycidae. It was described by Stephan von Breuning in 1969.
