= Pterolophioides =

Scientific classification
- Kingdom: Animalia
- Phylum: Arthropoda
- Class: Insecta
- Order: Coleoptera
- Suborder: Polyphaga
- Infraorder: Cucujiformia
- Family: Cerambycidae
- Tribe: Desmiphorini
- Genus: Pterolophioides

Genus of beetles

Pterolophioides is a genus of longhorn beetles of the subfamily Lamiinae, containing the following species:

- Pterolophioides camerunensis Breuning, 1967
- Pterolophioides guineensis Breuning, 1955
- Pterolophioides laterifuscus (Fairmaire, 1886)
- Pterolophioides stramentosus Breuning, 1942
- Pterolophioides subunicolor Breuning, 1969
