= Microestola flavolineata =

Scientific classification
- Kingdom: Animalia
- Phylum: Arthropoda
- Class: Insecta
- Order: Coleoptera
- Suborder: Polyphaga
- Infraorder: Cucujiformia
- Family: Cerambycidae
- Genus: Microestola
- Species: M. flavolineata

Binomial name
- Microestola flavolineata (Breuning, 1956)

Species of beetle

Microestola flavolineata is a species of beetle in the family Cerambycidae. It was described by Stephan von Breuning in 1956. It is known from China.
