= Microestola bidentata =

Scientific classification
- Kingdom: Animalia
- Phylum: Arthropoda
- Class: Insecta
- Order: Coleoptera
- Suborder: Polyphaga
- Infraorder: Cucujiformia
- Family: Cerambycidae
- Genus: Microestola
- Species: M. bidentata

Binomial name
- Microestola bidentata Gressitt, 1940

Species of beetle

Microestola bidentata is a species of beetle in the family Cerambycidae. It was described by Gressitt in 1940. It is known from China.
