= Microestola formosana =

Scientific classification
- Domain: Eukaryota
- Kingdom: Animalia
- Phylum: Arthropoda
- Class: Insecta
- Order: Coleoptera
- Suborder: Polyphaga
- Infraorder: Cucujiformia
- Family: Cerambycidae
- Genus: Microestola
- Species: M. formosana

Binomial name
- Microestola formosana Gressitt, 1951

Species of beetle

Microestola formosana is a species of beetle in the family Cerambycidae. It was described by Gressitt in 1951. It is known from Taiwan.
