= Microestola =

Scientific classification
- Domain: Eukaryota
- Kingdom: Animalia
- Phylum: Arthropoda
- Class: Insecta
- Order: Coleoptera
- Suborder: Polyphaga
- Infraorder: Cucujiformia
- Family: Cerambycidae
- Tribe: Desmiphorini
- Genus: Microestola; Gressitt, 1940

Synonyms
- Mimopothyne Breuning, 1956

Genus of beetles

Microestola is a genus of longhorn beetles of the subfamily Lamiinae.

== Species ==
Microestola contains the following species:

- Microestola bidentata Gressitt, 1940
- Microestola flavolineata Breuning, 1956
- Microestola formosana Gressitt, 1951
- Microestola interrupta Gressitt, 1951
- Microestola parallela Gressitt, 1951
