= Euestola basalis =

Scientific classification
- Kingdom: Animalia
- Phylum: Arthropoda
- Class: Insecta
- Order: Coleoptera
- Suborder: Polyphaga
- Infraorder: Cucujiformia
- Family: Cerambycidae
- Genus: Euestola
- Species: E. basalis

Binomial name
- Euestola basalis Martins & Galileo, 1997

Species of beetle

Euestola basalis is a species of beetle in the family Cerambycidae. It was described by Martins and Galileo in 1997. It is known from Brazil.
