= Euestola =

Scientific classification
- Kingdom: Animalia
- Phylum: Arthropoda
- Class: Insecta
- Order: Coleoptera
- Suborder: Polyphaga
- Infraorder: Cucujiformia
- Family: Cerambycidae
- Subfamily: Lamiinae
- Tribe: Desmiphorini
- Genus: Euestola; Breuning, 1943

Genus of beetles

Euestola is a genus of longhorn beetles of the subfamily Lamiinae, containing the following species:

- Euestola basalis Martins & Galileo, 1997
- Euestola basidensepunctata Breuning, 1943
- Euestola fasciata Martins & Galileo, 1997
- Euestola lineata Martins & Galileo, 1997
- Euestola obliqua Galileo & Martins, 2004
