= Euestola obliqua =

Scientific classification
- Kingdom: Animalia
- Phylum: Arthropoda
- Class: Insecta
- Order: Coleoptera
- Suborder: Polyphaga
- Infraorder: Cucujiformia
- Family: Cerambycidae
- Genus: Euestola
- Species: E. obliqua

Binomial name
- Euestola obliqua Galileo & Martins, 2004

Species of beetle

Euestola obliqua is a species of beetle in the family Cerambycidae. It was described by Galileo and Martins in 2004. It is known from Paraguay.
