= Parasulenus =

Scientific classification
- Kingdom: Animalia
- Phylum: Arthropoda
- Class: Insecta
- Order: Coleoptera
- Suborder: Polyphaga
- Infraorder: Cucujiformia
- Family: Cerambycidae
- Tribe: Desmiphorini
- Genus: Parasulenus

Genus of beetles

Parasulenus is a genus of longhorn beetles of the subfamily Lamiinae, containing the following species:

- Parasulenus affinis Breuning, 1970
- Parasulenus lebisi Breuning, 1957
- Parasulenus unicolor Breuning, 1971
- Parasulenus viossati Breuning, 1970
- Parasulenus vittipennis Breuning, 1957
