= Parasulenus lebisi =

Scientific classification
- Kingdom: Animalia
- Phylum: Arthropoda
- Class: Insecta
- Order: Coleoptera
- Suborder: Polyphaga
- Infraorder: Cucujiformia
- Family: Cerambycidae
- Genus: Parasulenus
- Species: P. lebisi

Binomial name
- Parasulenus lebisi Breuning, 1957

Species of beetle

Parasulenus lebisi is a species of beetle in the family Cerambycidae. It was described by Stephan von Breuning in 1957.
