= Asaperdina brunnea =

Scientific classification
- Domain: Eukaryota
- Kingdom: Animalia
- Phylum: Arthropoda
- Class: Insecta
- Order: Coleoptera
- Suborder: Polyphaga
- Infraorder: Cucujiformia
- Family: Cerambycidae
- Genus: Asaperdina
- Species: A. brunnea

Binomial name
- Asaperdina brunnea Pesarini & Sabbadini, 1999

Species of beetle

Asaperdina brunnea is a species of beetle in the family Cerambycidae. It was described by Pesarini and Sabbadini in 1999. It is known from China.
