= Asaperdina =

Scientific classification
- Kingdom: Animalia
- Phylum: Arthropoda
- Class: Insecta
- Order: Coleoptera
- Suborder: Polyphaga
- Infraorder: Cucujiformia
- Family: Cerambycidae
- Subfamily: Lamiinae
- Tribe: Desmiphorini
- Genus: Asaperdina; Breuning, 1975

Genus of beetles

Asaperdina is a genus of longhorn beetles of the subfamily Lamiinae, containing the following species:

- Asaperdina brunnea Pesarini & Sabbadini, 1999
- Asaperdina regularis (Pic, 1923)
- Asaperdina sordida (Gressitt, 1951)
- Asaperdina whiteheadi (Gressitt, 1940)
