= Asaperdina sordida =

Scientific classification
- Domain: Eukaryota
- Kingdom: Animalia
- Phylum: Arthropoda
- Class: Insecta
- Order: Coleoptera
- Suborder: Polyphaga
- Infraorder: Cucujiformia
- Family: Cerambycidae
- Genus: Asaperdina
- Species: A. sordida

Binomial name
- Asaperdina sordida (Gressitt, 1951)

Synonyms
- Pseudanaesthetis sordidus Gressitt, 1951

Species of beetle

Asaperdina sordida is a species of beetle in the family Cerambycidae. It was described by Gressitt in 1951. It is known from China.
