= Asaperdina whiteheadi =

Scientific classification
- Domain: Eukaryota
- Kingdom: Animalia
- Phylum: Arthropoda
- Class: Insecta
- Order: Coleoptera
- Suborder: Polyphaga
- Infraorder: Cucujiformia
- Family: Cerambycidae
- Genus: Asaperdina
- Species: A. whiteheadi

Binomial name
- Asaperdina whiteheadi (Gressitt, 1940)

Synonyms
- Cerambyx whiteheadi Gressitt, 1940; Pseudanaesthetis whiteheadi Gressitt, 1940

Species of beetle

Asaperdina whiteheadi is a species of beetle in the family Cerambycidae. It was described by Gressitt in 1940. It is known from China.
