= Asaperdina regularis =

Scientific classification
- Kingdom: Animalia
- Phylum: Arthropoda
- Class: Insecta
- Order: Coleoptera
- Suborder: Polyphaga
- Infraorder: Cucujiformia
- Family: Cerambycidae
- Genus: Asaperdina
- Species: A. regularis

Binomial name
- Asaperdina regularis (Pic, 1923)

Synonyms
- Asaperda regularis Pic, 1923

Species of beetle

Asaperdina regularis is a species of beetle in the family Cerambycidae. It was described by Pic in 1923. It is known from China and Japan.
