= Dolichestola densepunctata =

Scientific classification
- Kingdom: Animalia
- Phylum: Arthropoda
- Class: Insecta
- Order: Coleoptera
- Suborder: Polyphaga
- Infraorder: Cucujiformia
- Family: Cerambycidae
- Genus: Dolichestola
- Species: D. densepunctata

Binomial name
- Dolichestola densepunctata Breuning, 1942

Species of beetle

Dolichestola densepunctata is a species of beetle in the family Cerambycidae. It was described by Breuning in 1942. It is known from French Guiana and Panama.
