= Dolichestola =

Scientific classification
- Kingdom: Animalia
- Phylum: Arthropoda
- Class: Insecta
- Order: Coleoptera
- Suborder: Polyphaga
- Infraorder: Cucujiformia
- Family: Cerambycidae
- Subfamily: Lamiinae
- Tribe: Desmiphorini
- Genus: Dolichestola; Breuning, 1942

Genus of beetles

Dolichestola is a genus of longhorn beetles of the subfamily Lamiinae, containing the following species:

- Dolichestola annulicornis Breuning, 1942
- Dolichestola birai Galileo & Santos-Silva, 2016
- Dolichestola densepunctata Breuning, 1942
- Dolichestola egeri Martins, Santos-Silva & Galileo, 2015
- Dolichestola monnei Galileo & Santos-Silva, 2016
- Dolichestola nigricornis Breuning, 1942
- Dolichestola vittipennis Breuning, 1948
