= Dolichestola annulicornis =

Scientific classification
- Kingdom: Animalia
- Phylum: Arthropoda
- Class: Insecta
- Order: Coleoptera
- Suborder: Polyphaga
- Infraorder: Cucujiformia
- Family: Cerambycidae
- Genus: Dolichestola
- Species: D. annulicornis

Binomial name
- Dolichestola annulicornis Breuning, 1942

Species of beetle

Dolichestola annulicornis is a species of beetle in the family Cerambycidae. It was described by Breuning in 1942. It is known from Brazil and French Guiana.
