= Salvazaon metallicum =

Scientific classification
- Kingdom: Animalia
- Phylum: Arthropoda
- Class: Insecta
- Order: Coleoptera
- Suborder: Polyphaga
- Infraorder: Cucujiformia
- Family: Cerambycidae
- Genus: Salvazaon
- Species: S. metallicum

Binomial name
- Salvazaon metallicum Pic, 1928

Species of beetle

Salvazaon metallicum is a species of beetle in the family Cerambycidae. It was described by Maurice Pic in 1928.
