= Salvazaon =

Scientific classification
- Domain: Eukaryota
- Kingdom: Animalia
- Phylum: Arthropoda
- Class: Insecta
- Order: Coleoptera
- Suborder: Polyphaga
- Infraorder: Cucujiformia
- Family: Cerambycidae
- Subfamily: Lamiinae
- Genus: Salvazaon

Species
- Salvazaon curticornis (Pic, 1939); Salvazaon breve (Pic, 1940); Salvazaon metallicum (Pic, 1928); Salvazaon saginatum (Holzschuh, 1999)

Genus of beetles

Salvazaon is a genus of longhorn beetles of the subfamily Lamiinae, containing the following species:

subgenus Pseudophlyarus

- Salvazaon curticornis (Pic, 1939)

subgenus Salvazaon

- Salvazaon breve Pic, 1940
- Salvazaon metallicum Pic, 1928
- Salvazaon saginatum Holzschuh, 1999
