= Salvazaon curticornis =

Scientific classification
- Kingdom: Animalia
- Phylum: Arthropoda
- Class: Insecta
- Order: Coleoptera
- Suborder: Polyphaga
- Infraorder: Cucujiformia
- Family: Cerambycidae
- Genus: Salvazaon
- Species: S. curticornis

Binomial name
- Salvazaon curticornis (Pic, 1939)

Species of beetle

Salvazaon curticornis is a species of beetle in the family Cerambycidae. It was described by Maurice Pic in 1939.
