= Salvazaon saginatum =

Scientific classification
- Domain: Eukaryota
- Kingdom: Animalia
- Phylum: Arthropoda
- Class: Insecta
- Order: Coleoptera
- Suborder: Polyphaga
- Infraorder: Cucujiformia
- Family: Cerambycidae
- Genus: Salvazaon
- Species: S. saginatum

Binomial name
- Salvazaon saginatum Holzschuh, 1999

Species of beetle

Salvazaon saginatum is a species of beetle in the family Cerambycidae. It was described by Holzschuh in 1999.
