= Ectatosia =

Scientific classification
- Domain: Eukaryota
- Kingdom: Animalia
- Phylum: Arthropoda
- Class: Insecta
- Order: Coleoptera
- Suborder: Polyphaga
- Infraorder: Cucujiformia
- Family: Cerambycidae
- Tribe: Desmiphorini
- Genus: Ectatosia

Genus of beetles

Ectatosia is a genus of longhorn beetles of the subfamily Lamiinae, containing the following species:

- Ectatosia invitticollis Breuning, 1961
- Ectatosia maculosa Fisher, 1935
- Ectatosia moorei Pascoe, 1857
- Ectatosia sumatrensis Gahan, 1907
