= Ectatosia invitticollis =

Scientific classification
- Kingdom: Animalia
- Phylum: Arthropoda
- Class: Insecta
- Order: Coleoptera
- Suborder: Polyphaga
- Infraorder: Cucujiformia
- Family: Cerambycidae
- Genus: Ectatosia
- Species: E. invitticollis

Binomial name
- Ectatosia invitticollis Breuning, 1961

Species of beetle

Ectatosia invitticollis is a species of beetle in the family Cerambycidae. It was described by Stephan von Breuning in 1961.
