= Ectatosia sumatrensis =

Scientific classification
- Domain: Eukaryota
- Kingdom: Animalia
- Phylum: Arthropoda
- Class: Insecta
- Order: Coleoptera
- Suborder: Polyphaga
- Infraorder: Cucujiformia
- Family: Cerambycidae
- Genus: Ectatosia
- Species: E. sumatrensis

Binomial name
- Ectatosia sumatrensis Gahan, 1907

Synonyms
- Ectatosia albostictica Breuning, 1940

Species of beetle

Ectatosia sumatrensis is a species of beetle in the family Cerambycidae. It was described by Gahan in 1907.
