= Ectatosia moorei =

Scientific classification
- Kingdom: Animalia
- Phylum: Arthropoda
- Clade: Pancrustacea
- Class: Insecta
- Order: Coleoptera
- Suborder: Polyphaga
- Infraorder: Cucujiformia
- Family: Cerambycidae
- Genus: Ectatosia
- Species: E. moorei

Binomial name
- Ectatosia moorei Pascoe, 1857

Species of beetle

Ectatosia moorei is a species of beetle in the family Cerambycidae. It was described by Pascoe in 1857. It is known from Java, Borneo and Sumatra.
