= Ectatosia maculosa =

Scientific classification
- Kingdom: Animalia
- Phylum: Arthropoda
- Class: Insecta
- Order: Coleoptera
- Suborder: Polyphaga
- Infraorder: Cucujiformia
- Family: Cerambycidae
- Genus: Ectatosia
- Species: E. maculosa

Binomial name
- Ectatosia maculosa Fisher, 1935

Species of beetle

Ectatosia maculosa is a species of beetle in the family Cerambycidae. It was described by Fisher in 1935. It is known from Borneo.
