= Paradiadelia =

Scientific classification
- Kingdom: Animalia
- Phylum: Arthropoda
- Class: Insecta
- Order: Coleoptera
- Suborder: Polyphaga
- Infraorder: Cucujiformia
- Family: Cerambycidae
- Tribe: Desmiphorini
- Genus: Paradiadelia

Genus of beetles

Paradiadelia is a genus of longhorn beetles of the subfamily Lamiinae, containing the following species:

subgenus Obliquediadelia

- Paradiadelia mediofusca Breuning, 1957
- Paradiadelia rufotarsalis Breuning, 1957
- Paradiadelia tigrinata Breuning, 1975

subgenus Paradiadelia

- Paradiadelia bispinosa Breuning, 1940
