= Mimauxa =

Scientific classification
- Kingdom: Animalia
- Phylum: Arthropoda
- Class: Insecta
- Order: Coleoptera
- Suborder: Polyphaga
- Infraorder: Cucujiformia
- Family: Cerambycidae
- Tribe: Desmiphorini
- Genus: Mimauxa

Genus of beetles

Mimauxa is a genus of longhorn beetles of the subfamily Lamiinae, containing the following species:

- Mimauxa densepunctatus Breuning, 1957
- Mimauxa ochreoapicalis Breuning, 1970
- Mimauxa puncticollis Breuning, 1980
- Mimauxa rufoantennata Breuning, 1980
