= Parasophroniella tonkinensis =

Scientific classification
- Kingdom: Animalia
- Phylum: Arthropoda
- Class: Insecta
- Order: Coleoptera
- Suborder: Polyphaga
- Infraorder: Cucujiformia
- Family: Cerambycidae
- Genus: Parasophroniella
- Species: P. tonkinensis

Binomial name
- Parasophroniella tonkinensis Breuning, 1956

Species of beetle

Parasophroniella tonkinensis is a species of beetle in the family Cerambycidae. It was described by Stephan von Breuning in 1956.
