= Parasophroniella nigriscapus =

Scientific classification
- Kingdom: Animalia
- Phylum: Arthropoda
- Class: Insecta
- Order: Coleoptera
- Suborder: Polyphaga
- Infraorder: Cucujiformia
- Family: Cerambycidae
- Genus: Parasophroniella
- Species: P. nigriscapus

Binomial name
- Parasophroniella nigriscapus Breuning, 1975

Species of beetle

Parasophroniella nigriscapus is a species of beetle in the family Cerambycidae. It was described by Stephan von Breuning in 1975.
