= Parasophroniella =

Scientific classification
- Kingdom: Animalia
- Phylum: Arthropoda
- Class: Insecta
- Order: Coleoptera
- Suborder: Polyphaga
- Infraorder: Cucujiformia
- Family: Cerambycidae
- Tribe: Desmiphorini
- Genus: Parasophroniella

Genus of beetles

Parasophroniella is a genus of longhorn beetles of the subfamily Lamiinae, containing the following species:

- Parasophroniella birmanica Breuning, 1943
- Parasophroniella javanica Breuning, 1957
- Parasophroniella nigriscapus Breuning, 1975
- Parasophroniella tonkinensis Breuning, 1956
