= Falsoserixia longior =

Scientific classification
- Kingdom: Animalia
- Phylum: Arthropoda
- Class: Insecta
- Order: Coleoptera
- Suborder: Polyphaga
- Infraorder: Cucujiformia
- Family: Cerambycidae
- Genus: Falsoserixia
- Species: F. longior

Binomial name
- Falsoserixia longior Pic, 1928

Species of beetle

Falsoserixia longior is a species of beetle in the family Cerambycidae. It was described by Maurice Pic in 1928.
