= Falsoserixia fouqueti =

Scientific classification
- Kingdom: Animalia
- Phylum: Arthropoda
- Class: Insecta
- Order: Coleoptera
- Suborder: Polyphaga
- Infraorder: Cucujiformia
- Family: Cerambycidae
- Genus: Falsoserixia
- Species: F. fouqueti

Binomial name
- Falsoserixia fouqueti Pic, 1933

Species of beetle

Falsoserixia fouqueti is a species of beetle in the family Cerambycidae. It was described by Maurice Pic in 1933.
