= Falsoserixia =

Scientific classification
- Domain: Eukaryota
- Kingdom: Animalia
- Phylum: Arthropoda
- Class: Insecta
- Order: Coleoptera
- Suborder: Polyphaga
- Infraorder: Cucujiformia
- Family: Cerambycidae
- Tribe: Desmiphorini
- Genus: Falsoserixia

Genus of beetles

Falsoserixia is a genus of longhorn beetles of the subfamily Lamiinae, containing the following species:

- Falsoserixia fouqueti Pic, 1933
- Falsoserixia longior Pic, 1928
- Falsoserixia rubrithorax Pic, 1927
- Falsoserixia unicolor Pic, 1926
