= Falsoserixia unicolor =

Scientific classification
- Kingdom: Animalia
- Phylum: Arthropoda
- Class: Insecta
- Order: Coleoptera
- Suborder: Polyphaga
- Infraorder: Cucujiformia
- Family: Cerambycidae
- Genus: Falsoserixia
- Species: F. unicolor

Binomial name
- Falsoserixia unicolor Pic, 1926

Species of beetle

Falsoserixia unicolor is a species of beetle in the family Cerambycidae. It was described by Maurice Pic in 1926.
