= Pithomictus papuanus =

Scientific classification
- Kingdom: Animalia
- Phylum: Arthropoda
- Class: Insecta
- Order: Coleoptera
- Suborder: Polyphaga
- Infraorder: Cucujiformia
- Family: Cerambycidae
- Genus: Pithomictus
- Species: P. papuanus

Binomial name
- Pithomictus papuanus Breuning, 1959

Species of beetle

Pithomictus papuanus is a species of beetle in the family Cerambycidae. It was described by Stephan von Breuning in 1959.
