= Pithomictus amboinicus =

Scientific classification
- Kingdom: Animalia
- Phylum: Arthropoda
- Class: Insecta
- Order: Coleoptera
- Suborder: Polyphaga
- Infraorder: Cucujiformia
- Family: Cerambycidae
- Genus: Pithomictus
- Species: P. amboinicus

Binomial name
- Pithomictus amboinicus Breuning, 1957

Species of beetle

Pithomictus amboinicus is a species of beetle in the family Cerambycidae. It was described by Stephan von Breuning in 1957.
