= Pithomictus =

Scientific classification
- Kingdom: Animalia
- Phylum: Arthropoda
- Class: Insecta
- Order: Coleoptera
- Suborder: Polyphaga
- Infraorder: Cucujiformia
- Family: Cerambycidae
- Tribe: Desmiphorini
- Genus: Pithomictus

Genus of beetles

Pithomictus is a genus of longhorn beetles of the subfamily Lamiinae, containing the following species:

- Pithomictus amboinicus Breuning, 1957
- Pithomictus decoratus Pascoe, 1864
- Pithomictus emandibularis Heller, 1924
- Pithomictus papuanus Breuning, 1959
