= Pithomictus emandibularis =

Scientific classification
- Kingdom: Animalia
- Phylum: Arthropoda
- Class: Insecta
- Order: Coleoptera
- Suborder: Polyphaga
- Infraorder: Cucujiformia
- Family: Cerambycidae
- Genus: Pithomictus
- Species: P. emandibularis

Binomial name
- Pithomictus emandibularis Heller, 1924

Species of beetle

Pithomictus emandibularis is a species of beetle in the family Cerambycidae. It was described by Heller in 1924.
