= Pithomictus decoratus =

Scientific classification
- Kingdom: Animalia
- Phylum: Arthropoda
- Class: Insecta
- Order: Coleoptera
- Suborder: Polyphaga
- Infraorder: Cucujiformia
- Family: Cerambycidae
- Genus: Pithomictus
- Species: P. decoratus

Binomial name
- Pithomictus decoratus Pascoe, 1864

Species of beetle

Pithomictus decoratus is a species of beetle in the family Cerambycidae. It was described by Pascoe in 1864. It is known from Moluccas.
