= Meton (beetle) =

Scientific classification
- Domain: Eukaryota
- Kingdom: Animalia
- Phylum: Arthropoda
- Class: Insecta
- Order: Coleoptera
- Suborder: Polyphaga
- Infraorder: Cucujiformia
- Family: Cerambycidae
- Subfamily: Lamiinae
- Tribe: Desmiphorini
- Genus: Meton; Pascoe, 1859

Genus of beetles

Meton is a genus of longhorn beetles of the subfamily Lamiinae, containing the following species:

- Meton digglesi Pascoe, 1862
- Meton granulicollis Pascoe, 1859
- Meton tropicus Pascoe, 1862
