= Meton tropicus =

Scientific classification
- Domain: Eukaryota
- Kingdom: Animalia
- Phylum: Arthropoda
- Class: Insecta
- Order: Coleoptera
- Suborder: Polyphaga
- Infraorder: Cucujiformia
- Family: Cerambycidae
- Genus: Meton
- Species: M. tropicus

Binomial name
- Meton tropicus Pascoe, 1862

Synonyms
- Meton fasciatus Pascoe, 1878

Species of beetle

Meton tropicus is a species of beetle in the family Cerambycidae. It was described by Pascoe in 1862. It is known from Australia.
