= Meton granulicollis =

Scientific classification
- Kingdom: Animalia
- Phylum: Arthropoda
- Class: Insecta
- Order: Coleoptera
- Suborder: Polyphaga
- Infraorder: Cucujiformia
- Family: Cerambycidae
- Genus: Meton
- Species: M. granulicollis

Binomial name
- Meton granulicollis Pascoe, 1859

Species of beetle

Meton granulicollis is a species of beetle in the family Cerambycidae. It was described by Pascoe in 1859. It is known from Moluccas.

== Subspecies ==
- Meton granulicollis granulicollis Pascoe, 1859
- Meton granulicollis tenimberensis Breuning, 1965
