= Meton digglesi =

Scientific classification
- Domain: Eukaryota
- Kingdom: Animalia
- Phylum: Arthropoda
- Class: Insecta
- Order: Coleoptera
- Suborder: Polyphaga
- Infraorder: Cucujiformia
- Family: Cerambycidae
- Genus: Meton
- Species: M. digglesi

Binomial name
- Meton digglesi Pascoe, 1862

Synonyms
- Dulichium bigibbosum Thomson, 1864

Species of beetle

Meton digglesi is a species of beetle in the family Cerambycidae. It was described by Pascoe in 1862. It is known from Australia.
