= Gyrpanetes oriba =

Scientific classification
- Kingdom: Animalia
- Phylum: Arthropoda
- Class: Insecta
- Order: Coleoptera
- Suborder: Polyphaga
- Infraorder: Cucujiformia
- Family: Cerambycidae
- Genus: Gyrpanetes
- Species: G. oriba

Binomial name
- Gyrpanetes oriba Galileo & Martins, 2003

Species of beetle

Gyrpanetes oriba is a species of beetle in the family Cerambycidae. It was described by Galileo and Martins in 2003. It is known from Brazil.
