= Gyrpanetes =

Scientific classification
- Kingdom: Animalia
- Phylum: Arthropoda
- Class: Insecta
- Order: Coleoptera
- Suborder: Polyphaga
- Infraorder: Cucujiformia
- Family: Cerambycidae
- Tribe: Desmiphorini
- Genus: Gyrpanetes; Martins & Galileo, 1998

Genus of beetles

Gyrpanetes is a genus of longhorn beetles of the subfamily Lamiinae, containing the following species:

- Gyrpanetes cacapira Martins & Galileo, 1998
- Gyrpanetes clarkei Martins, Galileo & Santos-Silva, 2015
- Gyrpanetes oriba Galileo & Martins, 2003
- Gyrpanetes pukuaba Martins & Galileo, 1998
