= Gyrpanetes cacapira =

Scientific classification
- Kingdom: Animalia
- Phylum: Arthropoda
- Class: Insecta
- Order: Coleoptera
- Suborder: Polyphaga
- Infraorder: Cucujiformia
- Family: Cerambycidae
- Genus: Gyrpanetes
- Species: G. cacapira

Binomial name
- Gyrpanetes cacapira Martins & Galileo, 1998

Species of beetle

Gyrpanetes cacapira is a species of beetle in the family Cerambycidae. It was described by Martins and Galileo in 1998. It is known from Brazil.
