= Mimapatelarthron =

Scientific classification
- Domain: Eukaryota
- Kingdom: Animalia
- Phylum: Arthropoda
- Class: Insecta
- Order: Coleoptera
- Suborder: Polyphaga
- Infraorder: Cucujiformia
- Family: Cerambycidae
- Tribe: Desmiphorini
- Genus: Mimapatelarthron

Genus of beetles

Mimapatelarthron is a genus of longhorn beetles of the subfamily Lamiinae, containing the following species:

- Mimapatelarthron albonotatum Breuning, 1940
- Mimapatelarthron javanicum Breuning, 1940
- Mimapatelarthron laosense Breuning, 1968
