= Mimapatelarthron albonotatum =

Scientific classification
- Kingdom: Animalia
- Phylum: Arthropoda
- Class: Insecta
- Order: Coleoptera
- Suborder: Polyphaga
- Infraorder: Cucujiformia
- Family: Cerambycidae
- Genus: Mimapatelarthron
- Species: M. albonotatum

Binomial name
- Mimapatelarthron albonotatum Breuning, 1940

Species of beetle

Mimapatelarthron albonotatum is a species of beetle in the family Cerambycidae. It was described by Stephan von Breuning in 1940. It is known from Malaysia.
