= Mimapatelarthron laosense =

Scientific classification
- Kingdom: Animalia
- Phylum: Arthropoda
- Class: Insecta
- Order: Coleoptera
- Suborder: Polyphaga
- Infraorder: Cucujiformia
- Family: Cerambycidae
- Genus: Mimapatelarthron
- Species: M. laosense

Binomial name
- Mimapatelarthron laosense Breuning, 1968

Species of beetle

Mimapatelarthron laosense is a species of beetle in the family Cerambycidae. It was described by Stephan von Breuning in 1968. It is known from Laos (from which its species epithet is derived).
