= Ischnoleomimus =

Scientific classification
- Kingdom: Animalia
- Phylum: Arthropoda
- Class: Insecta
- Order: Coleoptera
- Suborder: Polyphaga
- Infraorder: Cucujiformia
- Family: Cerambycidae
- Tribe: Desmiphorini
- Genus: Ischnoleomimus

Genus of beetles

Ischnoleomimus is a genus of longhorn beetles of the subfamily Lamiinae, containing the following species:

- Ischnoleomimus arriagadai Galileo & Martins, 2004
- Ischnoleomimus excavatus Breuning, 1940
- Ischnoleomimus foveatus Galileo & Martins, 1996
