= Ischnoleomimus foveatus =

Scientific classification
- Kingdom: Animalia
- Phylum: Arthropoda
- Class: Insecta
- Order: Coleoptera
- Suborder: Polyphaga
- Infraorder: Cucujiformia
- Family: Cerambycidae
- Genus: Ischnoleomimus
- Species: I. foveatus

Binomial name
- Ischnoleomimus foveatus Galileo & Martins, 1996

Species of beetle

Ischnoleomimus foveatus is a species of beetle in the family Cerambycidae. It was described by Galileo and Martins in 1996. It is known from Bolivia and Ecuador.
