= Spinestoloides benardi =

Scientific classification
- Kingdom: Animalia
- Phylum: Arthropoda
- Class: Insecta
- Order: Coleoptera
- Suborder: Polyphaga
- Infraorder: Cucujiformia
- Family: Cerambycidae
- Genus: Spinestoloides
- Species: S. benardi

Binomial name
- Spinestoloides benardi (Breuning, 1980)

Species of beetle

Spinestoloides benardi is a species of beetle in the family Cerambycidae. It was described by Stephan von Breuning in 1980.
