= Spinestoloides fasciatus =

Scientific classification
- Domain: Eukaryota
- Kingdom: Animalia
- Phylum: Arthropoda
- Class: Insecta
- Order: Coleoptera
- Suborder: Polyphaga
- Infraorder: Cucujiformia
- Family: Cerambycidae
- Genus: Spinestoloides
- Species: S. fasciatus

Binomial name
- Spinestoloides fasciatus (Martins & Galileo, 2010)

Species of beetle

Spinestoloides fasciatus is a species of beetle in the family Cerambycidae. It was described by Martins & Galileo in 2010.
