= Spinestoloides =

Scientific classification
- Kingdom: Animalia
- Phylum: Arthropoda
- Class: Insecta
- Order: Coleoptera
- Suborder: Polyphaga
- Infraorder: Cucujiformia
- Family: Cerambycidae
- Tribe: Desmiphorini
- Genus: Spinestoloides; Breuning, 1954

Genus of beetles

Spinestoloides is a genus of longhorn beetles of the subfamily Lamiinae.

== Species ==
Spinestoloides contains the following species:

- Spinestoloides benardi (Breuning, 1980)
- Spinestoloides fasciatus (Martins & Galileo, 2010)
- Spinestoloides hefferni Santos-Silva, Wappes & Galileo, 2018
- Spinestoloides monticola (Fisher, 1942)
