= Sybrocentrura ropicoides =

Scientific classification
- Kingdom: Animalia
- Phylum: Arthropoda
- Class: Insecta
- Order: Coleoptera
- Suborder: Polyphaga
- Infraorder: Cucujiformia
- Family: Cerambycidae
- Genus: Sybrocentrura
- Species: S. ropicoides

Binomial name
- Sybrocentrura ropicoides (Gressitt, 1939)

Synonyms
- Diboma ropicoides (Gressitt, 1939); Sydonia ropicoides Gressitt, 1939; Zotalemimon ropicoides (Gressitt, 1939)

Species of beetle

Sybrocentrura ropicoides is a species of beetle in the family Cerambycidae. It was described by Gressitt in 1939.
