= Sybrocentrura obscura =

Scientific classification
- Kingdom: Animalia
- Phylum: Arthropoda
- Class: Insecta
- Order: Coleoptera
- Suborder: Polyphaga
- Infraorder: Cucujiformia
- Family: Cerambycidae
- Genus: Sybrocentrura
- Species: S. obscura

Binomial name
- Sybrocentrura obscura Breuning, 1947

Species of beetle

Sybrocentrura obscura is a species of beetle in the family Cerambycidae. It was described by Stephan von Breuning in 1947.
