= Sybrocentrura =

Scientific classification
- Kingdom: Animalia
- Phylum: Arthropoda
- Class: Insecta
- Order: Coleoptera
- Suborder: Polyphaga
- Infraorder: Cucujiformia
- Family: Cerambycidae
- Tribe: Desmiphorini
- Genus: Sybrocentrura

Genus of beetles

Sybrocentrura is a genus of longhorn beetles of the subfamily Lamiinae, containing the following species:

- Sybrocentrura obscura Breuning, 1947
- Sybrocentrura procerior Holzschuh, 2010
- Sybrocentrura ropicoides (Gressitt, 1939)
