= Sybrocentrura procerior =

Scientific classification
- Kingdom: Animalia
- Phylum: Arthropoda
- Class: Insecta
- Order: Coleoptera
- Suborder: Polyphaga
- Infraorder: Cucujiformia
- Family: Cerambycidae
- Genus: Sybrocentrura
- Species: S. procerior

Binomial name
- Sybrocentrura procerior Holzschuh, 2010

Species of beetle

Sybrocentrura procerior is a species of beetle in the family Cerambycidae. It was described by Holzschuh in 2010.
