= Parestola =

Scientific classification
- Kingdom: Animalia
- Phylum: Arthropoda
- Class: Insecta
- Order: Coleoptera
- Suborder: Polyphaga
- Infraorder: Cucujiformia
- Family: Cerambycidae
- Subfamily: Lamiinae
- Tribe: Desmiphorini
- Genus: Parestola; Breuning, 1954

Synonyms
- Falsestoloides Breuning, 1954

Genus of beetles

Parestola is a genus of longhorn beetles of the subfamily Lamiinae.

== Species ==
Parestola contains the following species:

- Parestola hoegei Breuning, 1943
- Parestola tubericollis (Breuning, 1980)
- Parestola zapotensis Bates, 1880
