= Parestola zapotensis =

Scientific classification
- Domain: Eukaryota
- Kingdom: Animalia
- Phylum: Arthropoda
- Class: Insecta
- Order: Coleoptera
- Suborder: Polyphaga
- Infraorder: Cucujiformia
- Family: Cerambycidae
- Genus: Parestola
- Species: P. zapotensis

Binomial name
- Parestola zapotensis Bates, 1880

Species of beetle

Parestola zapotensis is a species of beetle in the family Cerambycidae. It was described by Bates in 1880. It is known from Guatemala, Honduras, and Panama.
