= Parestola tubericollis =

Scientific classification
- Kingdom: Animalia
- Phylum: Arthropoda
- Class: Insecta
- Order: Coleoptera
- Suborder: Polyphaga
- Infraorder: Cucujiformia
- Family: Cerambycidae
- Genus: Parestola
- Species: P. tubericollis

Binomial name
- Parestola tubericollis (Breuning, 1980)

Synonyms
- Falsestoloides tubericollis Breuning, 1980

Species of beetle

Parestola tubericollis is a species of beetle in the family Cerambycidae. It was described by Stephan von Breuning in 1980.
