= Cymatonycha =

Scientific classification
- Kingdom: Animalia
- Phylum: Arthropoda
- Class: Insecta
- Order: Coleoptera
- Suborder: Polyphaga
- Infraorder: Cucujiformia
- Family: Cerambycidae
- Tribe: Desmiphorini
- Genus: Cymatonycha

Genus of beetles

Cymatonycha is a genus of longhorn beetles of the subfamily Lamiinae, containing the following species:

- Cymatonycha castanea Bates, 1874
- Cymatonycha fasciata Chemsak & Noguera, 1993
- Cymatonycha meridionalis Martins & Galileo, 1995
