= Cymatonycha fasciata =

Scientific classification
- Kingdom: Animalia
- Phylum: Arthropoda
- Class: Insecta
- Order: Coleoptera
- Suborder: Polyphaga
- Infraorder: Cucujiformia
- Family: Cerambycidae
- Genus: Cymatonycha
- Species: C. fasciata

Binomial name
- Cymatonycha fasciata Chemsak & Noguera, 1993

Species of beetle

Cymatonycha fasciata is a species of beetle in the family Cerambycidae. It was described by Chemsak and Noguera in 1993. It is known from Mexico.
