= Cymatonycha meridionalis =

Scientific classification
- Kingdom: Animalia
- Phylum: Arthropoda
- Class: Insecta
- Order: Coleoptera
- Suborder: Polyphaga
- Infraorder: Cucujiformia
- Family: Cerambycidae
- Genus: Cymatonycha
- Species: C. meridionalis

Binomial name
- Cymatonycha meridionalis Martins & Galileo, 1995

Species of beetle

Cymatonycha meridionalis is a species of beetle in the family Cerambycidae. It was described by Martins and Galileo in 1995. It is known from Colombia and Venezuela.
