= Cymatonycha castanea =

Scientific classification
- Kingdom: Animalia
- Phylum: Arthropoda
- Class: Insecta
- Order: Coleoptera
- Suborder: Polyphaga
- Infraorder: Cucujiformia
- Family: Cerambycidae
- Genus: Cymatonycha
- Species: C. castanea

Binomial name
- Cymatonycha castanea Bates, 1874

Species of beetle

Cymatonycha castanea is a species of beetle in the family Cerambycidae. It was described by Bates in 1874. It is known to be from Costa Rica, Honduras, and Guatemala.
