= Cicatrisestola flavicans =

Scientific classification
- Kingdom: Animalia
- Phylum: Arthropoda
- Class: Insecta
- Order: Coleoptera
- Suborder: Polyphaga
- Infraorder: Cucujiformia
- Family: Cerambycidae
- Genus: Cicatrisestola
- Species: C. flavicans

Binomial name
- Cicatrisestola flavicans Breuning, 1947

Species of beetle

Cicatrisestola flavicans is a species of beetle in the family Cerambycidae. It was described by Breuning in 1947. It is known from Argentina, Brazil, Bolivia and Paraguay.
