= Cicatrisestola elongata =

Scientific classification
- Kingdom: Animalia
- Phylum: Arthropoda
- Class: Insecta
- Order: Coleoptera
- Suborder: Polyphaga
- Infraorder: Cucujiformia
- Family: Cerambycidae
- Genus: Cicatrisestola
- Species: C. elongata

Binomial name
- Cicatrisestola elongata Breuning, 1964

Species of beetle

Cicatrisestola elongata is a species of beetle in the family Cerambycidae. It was described by Breuning in 1964. It is known from Brazil.
