= Cicatrisestola =

Scientific classification
- Kingdom: Animalia
- Phylum: Arthropoda
- Class: Insecta
- Order: Coleoptera
- Suborder: Polyphaga
- Infraorder: Cucujiformia
- Family: Cerambycidae
- Tribe: Desmiphorini
- Genus: Cicatrisestola

Genus of beetles

Cicatrisestola is a genus of longhorn beetles of the subfamily Lamiinae, containing the following species:

- Cicatrisestola elongata Breuning, 1964
- Cicatrisestola flavicans Breuning, 1947
- Cicatrisestola humeralis Martins & Galileo, 1995
