= Cicatrisestola humeralis =

Scientific classification
- Kingdom: Animalia
- Phylum: Arthropoda
- Class: Insecta
- Order: Coleoptera
- Suborder: Polyphaga
- Infraorder: Cucujiformia
- Family: Cerambycidae
- Genus: Cicatrisestola
- Species: C. humeralis

Binomial name
- Cicatrisestola humeralis Martins & Galileo, 1995

Species of beetle

Cicatrisestola humeralis is a species of beetle in the family Cerambycidae. It was described by Martins and Galileo in 1995. It is known from Argentina and Bolivia.
