= Parectatosia robusta =

Scientific classification
- Kingdom: Animalia
- Phylum: Arthropoda
- Class: Insecta
- Order: Coleoptera
- Suborder: Polyphaga
- Infraorder: Cucujiformia
- Family: Cerambycidae
- Genus: Parectatosia
- Species: P. robusta

Binomial name
- Parectatosia robusta (Aurivillius, 1911)

Synonyms
- Ectatina robusta Aurivillius, 1911

Species of beetle

Parectatosia robusta is a species of beetle in the family Cerambycidae. It was described by Per Olof Christopher Aurivillius in 1911. It is known from Borneo, Malaysia, and the Philippines.
