= Parectatosia =

Scientific classification
- Kingdom: Animalia
- Phylum: Arthropoda
- Class: Insecta
- Order: Coleoptera
- Suborder: Polyphaga
- Infraorder: Cucujiformia
- Family: Cerambycidae
- Tribe: Desmiphorini
- Genus: Parectatosia

Genus of beetles

Parectatosia is a genus of longhorn beetles of the subfamily Lamiinae, containing the following species:

- Parectatosia borneensis Breuning, 1940
- Parectatosia robusta (Aurivillius, 1911)
- Parectatosia valida Breuning, 1940
