= Mimogmodera =

Scientific classification
- Kingdom: Animalia
- Phylum: Arthropoda
- Class: Insecta
- Order: Coleoptera
- Suborder: Polyphaga
- Infraorder: Cucujiformia
- Family: Cerambycidae
- Tribe: Desmiphorini
- Genus: Mimogmodera

Genus of beetles

Mimogmodera is a genus of longhorn beetles of the subfamily Lamiinae, containing the following species:

- Mimogmodera congoensis (Breuning, 1953)
- Mimogmodera rufula Breuning, 1955
- Mimogmodera truncatipennis Breuning, 1969
