= Mimogmodera truncatipennis =

Scientific classification
- Kingdom: Animalia
- Phylum: Arthropoda
- Class: Insecta
- Order: Coleoptera
- Suborder: Polyphaga
- Infraorder: Cucujiformia
- Family: Cerambycidae
- Genus: Mimogmodera
- Species: M. truncatipennis

Binomial name
- Mimogmodera truncatipennis Breuning, 1969

Species of beetle

Mimogmodera truncatipennis is a species of beetle in the family Cerambycidae. It was described by Stephan von Breuning in 1969.
