= Mimogmodera rufula =

Scientific classification
- Kingdom: Animalia
- Phylum: Arthropoda
- Class: Insecta
- Order: Coleoptera
- Suborder: Polyphaga
- Infraorder: Cucujiformia
- Family: Cerambycidae
- Genus: Mimogmodera
- Species: M. rufula

Binomial name
- Mimogmodera rufula Breuning, 1955

Synonyms
- Parasybrinus fuscovittatus Breuning, 1978

Species of beetle

Mimogmodera rufula is a species of beetle in the family Cerambycidae. It was described by Stephan von Breuning in 1955.
