= Mimogmodera congoensis =

Scientific classification
- Kingdom: Animalia
- Phylum: Arthropoda
- Class: Insecta
- Order: Coleoptera
- Suborder: Polyphaga
- Infraorder: Cucujiformia
- Family: Cerambycidae
- Genus: Mimogmodera
- Species: M. congoensis

Binomial name
- Mimogmodera congoensis (Breuning, 1953)

Species of beetle

Mimogmodera congoensis is a species of beetle in the family Cerambycidae. It was described by Stephan von Breuning in 1953.
