= Curuapira =

Scientific classification
- Kingdom: Animalia
- Phylum: Arthropoda
- Class: Insecta
- Order: Coleoptera
- Suborder: Polyphaga
- Infraorder: Cucujiformia
- Family: Cerambycidae
- Tribe: Desmiphorini
- Genus: Curuapira

Genus of beetles

Curuapira is a genus of longhorn beetles of the subfamily Lamiinae, containing the following species:

- Curuapira apyama Martins & Galileo, 2005
- Curuapira exotica Martins & Galileo, 1998
- Curuapira tuberosa Galileo & Martins, 2003
