= Curuapira apyama =

Scientific classification
- Kingdom: Animalia
- Phylum: Arthropoda
- Class: Insecta
- Order: Coleoptera
- Suborder: Polyphaga
- Infraorder: Cucujiformia
- Family: Cerambycidae
- Genus: Curuapira
- Species: C. apyama

Binomial name
- Curuapira apyama Martins & Galileo, 2005

Species of beetle

Curuapira apyama is a species of beetle in the family Cerambycidae. It was described by Martins and Galileo in 2005. It is known from Bolivia.
