= Curuapira exotica =

Scientific classification
- Kingdom: Animalia
- Phylum: Arthropoda
- Class: Insecta
- Order: Coleoptera
- Suborder: Polyphaga
- Infraorder: Cucujiformia
- Family: Cerambycidae
- Genus: Curuapira
- Species: C. exotica

Binomial name
- Curuapira exotica Martins & Galileo, 1998

Species of beetle

Curuapira exotica is a species of beetle in the family Cerambycidae. It was described by Martins and Galileo in 1998. It is known from Brazil and Venezuela.
