= Mynonebra opaca =

Scientific classification
- Kingdom: Animalia
- Phylum: Arthropoda
- Class: Insecta
- Order: Coleoptera
- Suborder: Polyphaga
- Infraorder: Cucujiformia
- Family: Cerambycidae
- Genus: Mynonebra
- Species: M. opaca

Binomial name
- Mynonebra opaca Fisher, 1925

Species of beetle

Mynonebra opaca is a species of beetle in the family Cerambycidae. It was described by Fisher in 1925.
