= Mynonebra =

Scientific classification
- Kingdom: Animalia
- Phylum: Arthropoda
- Class: Insecta
- Order: Coleoptera
- Suborder: Polyphaga
- Infraorder: Cucujiformia
- Family: Cerambycidae
- Tribe: Desmiphorini
- Genus: Mynonebra

Genus of beetles

Mynonebra is a genus of longhorn beetles of the subfamily Lamiinae, containing the following species:

- Mynonebra diversa Pascoe, 1864
- Mynonebra opaca Fisher, 1925
- Mynonebra villica Pascoe, 1864
