= Mynonebra villica =

Scientific classification
- Kingdom: Animalia
- Phylum: Arthropoda
- Class: Insecta
- Order: Coleoptera
- Suborder: Polyphaga
- Infraorder: Cucujiformia
- Family: Cerambycidae
- Genus: Mynonebra
- Species: M. villica

Binomial name
- Mynonebra villica Pascoe, 1864

Synonyms
- Mynonebra consputa Pascoe, 1864

Species of beetle

Mynonebra villica is a species of beetle in the family Cerambycidae. It was described by Pascoe in 1864. It contains the varietas Mynonebra villica var. angulata.
