= Metallographeus =

Scientific classification
- Kingdom: Animalia
- Phylum: Arthropoda
- Class: Insecta
- Order: Coleoptera
- Suborder: Polyphaga
- Infraorder: Cucujiformia
- Family: Cerambycidae
- Tribe: Desmiphorini
- Genus: Metallographeus

Genus of beetles

Metallographeus is a genus of longhorn beetles of the subfamily Lamiinae, containing the following species:

- Metallographeus albolineatus Breuning, 1970
- Metallographeus angolensis Breuning, 1978
- Metallographeus ghanaensis Breuning, 1978
