= Metallographeus angolensis =

Scientific classification
- Kingdom: Animalia
- Phylum: Arthropoda
- Class: Insecta
- Order: Coleoptera
- Suborder: Polyphaga
- Infraorder: Cucujiformia
- Family: Cerambycidae
- Genus: Metallographeus
- Species: M. angolensis

Binomial name
- Metallographeus angolensis Breuning, 1978

Species of beetle

Metallographeus angolensis is a species of beetle in the family Cerambycidae. It was described by Stephan von Breuning in 1978.
