= Terinaea imasakai =

Scientific classification
- Kingdom: Animalia
- Phylum: Arthropoda
- Class: Insecta
- Order: Coleoptera
- Suborder: Polyphaga
- Infraorder: Cucujiformia
- Family: Cerambycidae
- Genus: Terinaea
- Species: T. imasakai

Binomial name
- Terinaea imasakai Hayashi, 1983

Species of beetle

Terinaea imasakai is a species of beetle in the family Cerambycidae. It was described by Hayashi in 1983.
