= Terinaea =

Scientific classification
- Kingdom: Animalia
- Phylum: Arthropoda
- Class: Insecta
- Order: Coleoptera
- Suborder: Polyphaga
- Infraorder: Cucujiformia
- Family: Cerambycidae
- Tribe: Desmiphorini
- Genus: Terinaea

Genus of beetles

Terinaea is a genus of longhorn beetles of the subfamily Lamiinae, containing the following species:

- Terinaea atrofusca Bates, 1884
- Terinaea imasakai Hayashi, 1983
- Terinaea rufonigra Gressitt, 1940
