= Terinaea rufonigra =

Scientific classification
- Kingdom: Animalia
- Phylum: Arthropoda
- Class: Insecta
- Order: Coleoptera
- Suborder: Polyphaga
- Infraorder: Cucujiformia
- Family: Cerambycidae
- Genus: Terinaea
- Species: T. rufonigra

Binomial name
- Terinaea rufonigra Gressitt, 1940

Species of beetle

Terinaea rufonigra is a species of beetle in the family Cerambycidae. It was described by Gressitt in 1940.
