= Terinaea atrofusca =

Scientific classification
- Kingdom: Animalia
- Phylum: Arthropoda
- Class: Insecta
- Order: Coleoptera
- Suborder: Polyphaga
- Infraorder: Cucujiformia
- Family: Cerambycidae
- Genus: Terinaea
- Species: T. atrofusca

Binomial name
- Terinaea atrofusca Bates, 1884

Species of beetle

Terinaea atrofusca is a species of beetle in the family Cerambycidae. It was described by Bates in 1884. It is known from Japan.

The Latin specific epithet atrofusca means "dark brown".
