= Striononyma =

Scientific classification
- Kingdom: Animalia
- Phylum: Arthropoda
- Class: Insecta
- Order: Coleoptera
- Suborder: Polyphaga
- Infraorder: Cucujiformia
- Family: Cerambycidae
- Tribe: Desmiphorini
- Genus: Striononyma

Genus of beetles

Striononyma is a genus of longhorn beetles of the subfamily Lamiinae, containing the following species:

- Striononyma flavofasciata Breuning, 1960
- Striononyma flavovariegata Breuning, 1960
- Striononyma unicolor Breuning, 1961
