= Striononyma flavofasciata =

Scientific classification
- Kingdom: Animalia
- Phylum: Arthropoda
- Class: Insecta
- Order: Coleoptera
- Suborder: Polyphaga
- Infraorder: Cucujiformia
- Family: Cerambycidae
- Genus: Striononyma
- Species: S. flavofasciata

Binomial name
- Striononyma flavofasciata Breuning, 1960

Species of beetle

Striononyma flavofasciata is a species of beetle in the family Cerambycidae. It was described by Stephan von Breuning in 1960.
