= Sulenus =

Scientific classification
- Kingdom: Animalia
- Phylum: Arthropoda
- Class: Insecta
- Order: Coleoptera
- Suborder: Polyphaga
- Infraorder: Cucujiformia
- Family: Cerambycidae
- Tribe: Desmiphorini
- Genus: Sulenus

Genus of beetles

Sulenus is a genus of longhorn beetles of the subfamily Lamiinae, containing the following species:

- Sulenus humeralis Lacordaire, 1872
- Sulenus macrophthalmus Breuning, 1954
- Sulenus vadoni Breuning, 1957
