= Inermestoloides =

Scientific classification
- Kingdom: Animalia
- Phylum: Arthropoda
- Class: Insecta
- Order: Coleoptera
- Suborder: Polyphaga
- Infraorder: Cucujiformia
- Family: Cerambycidae
- Tribe: Desmiphorini
- Genus: Inermestoloides; Breuning, 1966

Genus of beetles

Inermestoloides is a genus of longhorn beetles of the subfamily Lamiinae, containing the following species:

- Inermestoloides birai Bezark, Galileo & Santos-Silva, 2016
- Inermestoloides drumonti Bezark, Galileo & Santos-Silva, 2016
- Inermestoloides ecuadorensis Bezark, Galileo & Santos-Silva, 2016
- Inermestoloides flavus Galileo & Santos-Silva, 2016
- Inermestoloides praeapicealba Breuning, 1966
- Inermestoloides rumuara Martins & Galileo, 2006
