= Inermestoloides rumuara =

Scientific classification
- Kingdom: Animalia
- Phylum: Arthropoda
- Class: Insecta
- Order: Coleoptera
- Suborder: Polyphaga
- Infraorder: Cucujiformia
- Family: Cerambycidae
- Genus: Inermestoloides
- Species: I. rumuara

Binomial name
- Inermestoloides rumuara Martins & Galileo, 2006

Species of beetle

Inermestoloides rumuara is a species of beetle in the family Cerambycidae. It was described by Martins and Galileo in 2006. It is known from Bolivia.
