= Inermestoloides praeapicealba =

Scientific classification
- Kingdom: Animalia
- Phylum: Arthropoda
- Class: Insecta
- Order: Coleoptera
- Suborder: Polyphaga
- Infraorder: Cucujiformia
- Family: Cerambycidae
- Genus: Inermestoloides
- Species: I. praeapicealba

Binomial name
- Inermestoloides praeapicealba Breuning, 1966

Species of beetle

Inermestoloides praeapicealba is a species of beetle in the family Cerambycidae. It was described by Stephan von Breuning in 1966. It is known from Brazil.
