= Arhopaloscelis bifasciatus =

Scientific classification
- Kingdom: Animalia
- Phylum: Arthropoda
- Class: Insecta
- Order: Coleoptera
- Suborder: Polyphaga
- Infraorder: Cucujiformia
- Family: Cerambycidae
- Genus: Arhopaloscelis
- Species: A. bifasciatus

Binomial name
- Arhopaloscelis bifasciatus (Kraatz, 1879)

Synonyms
- Rhopaloscelis bifasciatus Kraatz, 1879

Species of beetle

Arhopaloscelis bifasciatus is a species of beetle in the family Cerambycidae. It was described by Kraatz in 1879. It is known from China, Japan, Russia, and Siberia.
