= Arhopaloscelis maculatus =

Scientific classification
- Kingdom: Animalia
- Phylum: Arthropoda
- Class: Insecta
- Order: Coleoptera
- Suborder: Polyphaga
- Infraorder: Cucujiformia
- Family: Cerambycidae
- Genus: Arhopaloscelis
- Species: A. maculatus

Binomial name
- Arhopaloscelis maculatus (Bates, 1877)

Species of beetle

Arhopaloscelis maculatus is a species of beetle in the family Cerambycidae. It was described by Bates in 1877. It is known from Japan and Taiwan.
