= Arhopaloscelis =

Scientific classification
- Kingdom: Animalia
- Phylum: Arthropoda
- Class: Insecta
- Order: Coleoptera
- Suborder: Polyphaga
- Infraorder: Cucujiformia
- Family: Cerambycidae
- Tribe: Desmiphorini
- Genus: Arhopaloscelis; Murzin, Danilevsky & Lobanov, 1981

Genus of beetles

Arhopaloscelis is a genus of longhorn beetles of the subfamily Lamiinae, containing the following species:

- Arhopaloscelis bifasciatus (Kraatz, 1879)
- Arhopaloscelis maculatus (Bates, 1877)
