= Cicuiara striata =

Scientific classification
- Kingdom: Animalia
- Phylum: Arthropoda
- Class: Insecta
- Order: Coleoptera
- Suborder: Polyphaga
- Infraorder: Cucujiformia
- Family: Cerambycidae
- Genus: Cicuiara
- Species: C. striata

Binomial name
- Cicuiara striata (Bates, 1866)

Synonyms
- Cosmotomidius striatus (Bates) Gilmour, 1965; Exocentrus striatus Bates, 1866

Species of beetle

Cicuiara striata is a species of beetle in the family Cerambycidae. It was first described by Henry Walter Bates in 1866 as Exocentrus striatus. It is found in Brazil and Venezuela.
