= Cicuiara nitidula =

Scientific classification
- Kingdom: Animalia
- Phylum: Arthropoda
- Class: Insecta
- Order: Coleoptera
- Suborder: Polyphaga
- Infraorder: Cucujiformia
- Family: Cerambycidae
- Genus: Cicuiara
- Species: C. nitidula

Binomial name
- Cicuiara nitidula (Bates, 1866)

Synonyms
- Cosmotomidius nitidulus (Bates) Gilmour, 1965; Exocentrus nitidulus Bates, 1866

Species of beetle

Cicuiara nitidula is a species of beetle in the family Cerambycidae. It was described by Bates in 1866. It is known from Brazil.
