= Cicuiara =

Scientific classification
- Kingdom: Animalia
- Phylum: Arthropoda
- Class: Insecta
- Order: Coleoptera
- Suborder: Polyphaga
- Infraorder: Cucujiformia
- Family: Cerambycidae
- Tribe: Desmiphorini
- Genus: Cicuiara

Genus of beetles

Cicuiara is a genus of longhorn beetles of the subfamily Lamiinae, containing the following species:

- Cicuiara nitidula (Bates, 1866)
- Cicuiara striata (Bates, 1866)
