= Epicasta turbida =

Scientific classification
- Kingdom: Animalia
- Phylum: Arthropoda
- Class: Insecta
- Order: Coleoptera
- Suborder: Polyphaga
- Infraorder: Cucujiformia
- Family: Cerambycidae
- Genus: Epicasta
- Species: E. turbida

Binomial name
- Epicasta turbida (Pascoe, 1866)

Synonyms
- Psaumis turbidus Pascoe, 1866

Species of beetle

Epicasta turbida is a species of beetle in the family Cerambycidae. It was described by Pascoe in 1866. It is known from Malaysia.
