= Epicasta ocellata =

Scientific classification
- Kingdom: Animalia
- Phylum: Arthropoda
- Class: Insecta
- Order: Coleoptera
- Suborder: Polyphaga
- Infraorder: Cucujiformia
- Family: Cerambycidae
- Genus: Epicasta
- Species: E. ocellata

Binomial name
- Epicasta ocellata Thomson, 1864

Species of beetle

Epicasta ocellata is a species of beetle in the family Cerambycidae. It was described by Thomson in 1864.
