= Epicasta (beetle) =

Scientific classification
- Kingdom: Animalia
- Phylum: Arthropoda
- Class: Insecta
- Order: Coleoptera
- Suborder: Polyphaga
- Infraorder: Cucujiformia
- Family: Cerambycidae
- Subfamily: Lamiinae
- Tribe: Desmiphorini
- Genus: Epicasta; Thomson, 1864

Synonyms
- Psaumis Pascoe, 1866

Genus of beetles

Epicasta is a genus in the longhorn beetle family Cerambycidae. There are at least two described species in Epicasta.

== Species ==
These two species belong to the genus Epicasta:

- Epicasta ocellata Thomson, 1864 (Java)
- Epicasta turbida (Pascoe, 1866) (Sarawak, Malaysia, Borneo)
