= Paradesmiphora amazonica =

Scientific classification
- Kingdom: Animalia
- Phylum: Arthropoda
- Class: Insecta
- Order: Coleoptera
- Suborder: Polyphaga
- Infraorder: Cucujiformia
- Family: Cerambycidae
- Genus: Paradesmiphora
- Species: P. amazonica

Binomial name
- Paradesmiphora amazonica Galileo & Martins, 1998

Species of beetle

Paradesmiphora amazonica is a species of beetle in the family Cerambycidae. It was described by Galileo and Martins in 1998. It is known from Peru.
