= Paradesmiphora =

Scientific classification
- Kingdom: Animalia
- Phylum: Arthropoda
- Clade: Pancrustacea
- Class: Insecta
- Order: Coleoptera
- Suborder: Polyphaga
- Infraorder: Cucujiformia
- Family: Cerambycidae
- Subfamily: Lamiinae
- Tribe: Desmiphorini
- Genus: Paradesmiphora; Breuning, 1959

Genus of beetles

Paradesmiphora is a genus of longhorn beetles of the subfamily Lamiinae, containing the following species:

- Paradesmiphora amazonica Galileo & Martins, 1998
- Paradesmiphora farinosa (Bates, 1885)
