= Mimetaxalus =

Scientific classification
- Kingdom: Animalia
- Phylum: Arthropoda
- Class: Insecta
- Order: Coleoptera
- Suborder: Polyphaga
- Infraorder: Cucujiformia
- Family: Cerambycidae
- Tribe: Desmiphorini
- Genus: Mimetaxalus

Genus of beetles

Mimetaxalus is a genus of longhorn beetles of the subfamily Lamiinae, containing the following species:

- Mimetaxalus densepunctatus Breuning, 1957
- Mimetaxalus ochreoapicalis Breuning, 1971
