= Mimetaxalus ochreoapicalis =

Scientific classification
- Kingdom: Animalia
- Phylum: Arthropoda
- Class: Insecta
- Order: Coleoptera
- Suborder: Polyphaga
- Infraorder: Cucujiformia
- Family: Cerambycidae
- Genus: Mimetaxalus
- Species: M. ochreoapicalis

Binomial name
- Mimetaxalus ochreoapicalis Breuning, 1971

Species of beetle

Mimetaxalus ochreoapicalis is a species of beetle in the family Cerambycidae. It was described by Stephan von Breuning in 1971. It is known from Madagascar.
