= Anacasta conspersa =

Scientific classification
- Kingdom: Animalia
- Phylum: Arthropoda
- Class: Insecta
- Order: Coleoptera
- Suborder: Polyphaga
- Infraorder: Cucujiformia
- Family: Cerambycidae
- Genus: Anacasta
- Species: A. conspersa

Binomial name
- Anacasta conspersa Aurivillius, 1916

Synonyms
- Pseudopharsalia flavostictica Breuning, 1969

Species of beetle

Anacasta conspersa is a species of beetle in the family Cerambycidae. It was described by Per Olof Christopher Aurivillius in 1916. It is known from Borneo.
