= Anacasta =

Scientific classification
- Domain: Eukaryota
- Kingdom: Animalia
- Phylum: Arthropoda
- Class: Insecta
- Order: Coleoptera
- Suborder: Polyphaga
- Infraorder: Cucujiformia
- Family: Cerambycidae
- Tribe: Desmiphorini
- Genus: Anacasta; Aurivillius, 1916

Genus of beetles

Anacasta is a genus of longhorn beetles of the subfamily Lamiinae, containing the following species:

- Anacasta biplagiata Breuning, 1940
- Anacasta conspersa Aurivillius, 1916
