= Anaespogonius piceonigris =

Scientific classification
- Kingdom: Animalia
- Phylum: Arthropoda
- Class: Insecta
- Order: Coleoptera
- Suborder: Polyphaga
- Infraorder: Cucujiformia
- Family: Cerambycidae
- Genus: Anaespogonius
- Species: A. piceonigris

Binomial name
- Anaespogonius piceonigris Hayashi, 1972

Species of beetle

Anaespogonius piceonigris is a species of beetle in the family Cerambycidae. It was described by Hayashi in 1972. It is known from Japan.
