= Anaespogonius fulvus =

Scientific classification
- Domain: Eukaryota
- Kingdom: Animalia
- Phylum: Arthropoda
- Class: Insecta
- Order: Coleoptera
- Suborder: Polyphaga
- Infraorder: Cucujiformia
- Family: Cerambycidae
- Genus: Anaespogonius
- Species: A. fulvus

Binomial name
- Anaespogonius fulvus Gressitt, 1938

Species of beetle

Anaespogonius fulvus is a species of beetle in the family Cerambycidae. It was described by Gressitt in 1938. It is known from China.
