= Anaespogonius =

Scientific classification
- Domain: Eukaryota
- Kingdom: Animalia
- Phylum: Arthropoda
- Class: Insecta
- Order: Coleoptera
- Suborder: Polyphaga
- Infraorder: Cucujiformia
- Family: Cerambycidae
- Tribe: Desmiphorini
- Genus: Anaespogonius; Gressitt, 1938

Genus of beetles

Anaespogonius is a genus of longhorn beetles of the subfamily Lamiinae, containing the following species:

- Anaespogonius fulvus Gressitt, 1938
- Anaespogonius piceonigris Hayashi, 1972
