= Atimiola rickstanleyi =

Scientific classification
- Kingdom: Animalia
- Phylum: Arthropoda
- Class: Insecta
- Order: Coleoptera
- Suborder: Polyphaga
- Infraorder: Cucujiformia
- Family: Cerambycidae
- Genus: Atimiola
- Species: A. rickstanleyi

Binomial name
- Atimiola rickstanleyi Lingafelter & Nearns, 2007

Species of beetle

Atimiola rickstanleyi is a species of beetle in the family Cerambycidae. It was described by Lingafelter and Nearns in 2007. It is known from the Dominican Republic.
