= Atimiola =

Scientific classification
- Kingdom: Animalia
- Phylum: Arthropoda
- Class: Insecta
- Order: Coleoptera
- Suborder: Polyphaga
- Infraorder: Cucujiformia
- Family: Cerambycidae
- Tribe: Desmiphorini
- Genus: Atimiola

Genus of beetles

Atimiola is a genus of longhorn beetles of the subfamily Lamiinae, containing the following species:

- Atimiola guttulata Bates, 1880
- Atimiola rickstanleyi Lingafelter & Nearns, 2007
