= Atimiola guttulata =

Scientific classification
- Kingdom: Animalia
- Phylum: Arthropoda
- Class: Insecta
- Order: Coleoptera
- Suborder: Polyphaga
- Infraorder: Cucujiformia
- Family: Cerambycidae
- Genus: Atimiola
- Species: A. guttulata

Binomial name
- Atimiola guttulata Bates, 1880

Species of beetle

Atimiola guttulata is a species of beetle in the family Cerambycidae. It was described by Bates in 1880. It is known from Belize, Mexico, Costa Rica, Guatemala, Honduras, and Nicaragua.
