= Pseudestola =

Scientific classification
- Kingdom: Animalia
- Phylum: Arthropoda
- Class: Insecta
- Order: Coleoptera
- Suborder: Polyphaga
- Infraorder: Cucujiformia
- Family: Cerambycidae
- Tribe: Desmiphorini
- Genus: Pseudestola; Breuning, 1940

Genus of beetles

Pseudestola is a genus of longhorn beetles of the subfamily Lamiinae, containing the following species:

- Pseudestola ayri Galileo & Martins, 2012
- Pseudestola densepunctata Breuning, 1940
- Pseudestola maculata Bezark & Santos-Silva, 2019
