= Pseudestola ayri =

Scientific classification
- Kingdom: Animalia
- Phylum: Arthropoda
- Class: Insecta
- Order: Coleoptera
- Suborder: Polyphaga
- Infraorder: Cucujiformia
- Family: Cerambycidae
- Genus: Pseudestola
- Species: P. ayri

Binomial name
- Pseudestola ayri Galileo & Martins, 2012

Species of beetle

Pseudestola ayri is a species of beetle in the family Cerambycidae, found in Costa Rica. It was described by Galileo and Martins in 2012.
