= Pogonillus =

Scientific classification
- Kingdom: Animalia
- Phylum: Arthropoda
- Class: Insecta
- Order: Coleoptera
- Suborder: Polyphaga
- Infraorder: Cucujiformia
- Family: Cerambycidae
- Tribe: Desmiphorini
- Genus: Pogonillus; Bates, 1885

Genus of beetles

Pogonillus is a genus of longhorn beetles of the subfamily Lamiinae, containing the following species:

- Pogonillus inermis Bates, 1885
- Pogonillus panamensis Heffern, Nascimento & Santos-Silva, 2018
- Pogonillus subfasciatus Bates, 1885
