= Pogonillus subfasciatus =

Scientific classification
- Kingdom: Animalia
- Phylum: Arthropoda
- Class: Insecta
- Order: Coleoptera
- Suborder: Polyphaga
- Infraorder: Cucujiformia
- Family: Cerambycidae
- Genus: Pogonillus
- Species: P. subfasciatus

Binomial name
- Pogonillus subfasciatus Bates, 1885

Species of beetle

Pogonillus subfasciatus is a species of beetle in the family Cerambycidae. It was described by Bates in 1885. It is known from Honduras and Guatemala.
