= Trichauxa albovittata =

Scientific classification
- Kingdom: Animalia
- Phylum: Arthropoda
- Class: Insecta
- Order: Coleoptera
- Suborder: Polyphaga
- Infraorder: Cucujiformia
- Family: Cerambycidae
- Genus: Trichauxa
- Species: T. albovittata

Binomial name
- Trichauxa albovittata Breuning, 1966

Species of beetle

Trichauxa albovittata is a species of beetle in the family Cerambycidae. It was described by Stephan von Breuning in 1966.

== Subspecies ==
- Trichauxa albovittata albovittata Breuning, 1966
- Trichauxa albovittata descarpentriesi Breuning, 1975
