= Trichauxa =

Scientific classification
- Kingdom: Animalia
- Phylum: Arthropoda
- Class: Insecta
- Order: Coleoptera
- Suborder: Polyphaga
- Infraorder: Cucujiformia
- Family: Cerambycidae
- Tribe: Desmiphorini
- Genus: Trichauxa

Genus of beetles

Trichauxa is a genus of longhorn beetles of the subfamily Lamiinae, containing the following species:

- Trichauxa albovittata Breuning, 1966
- Trichauxa fusca Breuning, 1957
