= Trichauxa fusca =

Scientific classification
- Kingdom: Animalia
- Phylum: Arthropoda
- Class: Insecta
- Order: Coleoptera
- Suborder: Polyphaga
- Infraorder: Cucujiformia
- Family: Cerambycidae
- Genus: Trichauxa
- Species: T. fusca

Binomial name
- Trichauxa fusca Breuning, 1957

Species of beetle

Trichauxa fusca is a species of beetle in the family Cerambycidae. It was described by Stephan von Breuning in 1957.
