= Falsostesilea perforata =

Scientific classification
- Kingdom: Animalia
- Phylum: Arthropoda
- Class: Insecta
- Order: Coleoptera
- Suborder: Polyphaga
- Infraorder: Cucujiformia
- Family: Cerambycidae
- Genus: Falsostesilea
- Species: F. perforata

Binomial name
- Falsostesilea perforata (Pic, 1926)

Synonyms
- Mimosybra melli Breuning, 1964; Stesilea perforata Pic, 1926

Species of beetle

Falsostesilea perforata is a species of beetle in the family Cerambycidae. It was described by Pic in 1926.
