= Coeloprocta singularis =

Scientific classification
- Kingdom: Animalia
- Phylum: Arthropoda
- Class: Insecta
- Order: Coleoptera
- Suborder: Polyphaga
- Infraorder: Cucujiformia
- Family: Cerambycidae
- Genus: Coeloprocta
- Species: C. singularis

Binomial name
- Coeloprocta singularis Aurivillius, 1926

Species of beetle

Coeloprocta singularis is a species of beetle in the family Cerambycidae. It was described by Per Olof Christopher Aurivillius in 1926 and is known from Brazil.
