= Coeloprocta humeralis =

Scientific classification
- Kingdom: Animalia
- Phylum: Arthropoda
- Class: Insecta
- Order: Coleoptera
- Suborder: Polyphaga
- Infraorder: Cucujiformia
- Family: Cerambycidae
- Genus: Coeloprocta
- Species: C. humeralis

Binomial name
- Coeloprocta humeralis (Breuning, 1940)

Species of beetle

Coeloprocta humeralis is a species of beetle in the family Cerambycidae. It was described by Breuning in 1940. It is known from Brazil.
