= Coeloprocta =

Scientific classification
- Kingdom: Animalia
- Phylum: Arthropoda
- Class: Insecta
- Order: Coleoptera
- Suborder: Polyphaga
- Infraorder: Cucujiformia
- Family: Cerambycidae
- Tribe: Desmiphorini
- Genus: Coeloprocta

Genus of beetles

Coeloprocta is a genus of longhorn beetles of the subfamily Lamiinae, containing the following species:

- Coeloprocta humeralis (Breuning, 1940)
- Coeloprocta singularis Aurivillius, 1926
