= Aconopterus =

Scientific classification
- Domain: Eukaryota
- Kingdom: Animalia
- Phylum: Arthropoda
- Class: Insecta
- Order: Coleoptera
- Suborder: Polyphaga
- Infraorder: Cucujiformia
- Family: Cerambycidae
- Tribe: Desmiphorini
- Genus: Aconopterus

Genus of beetles

Aconopterus is a genus of longhorn beetles of the subfamily Lamiinae, containing the following species:

- Aconopterus cristatipennis Blanchard in Gay, 1851
- Aconopterus strandi Breuning, 1943
