= Aconopterus cristatipennis =

Scientific classification
- Kingdom: Animalia
- Phylum: Arthropoda
- Class: Insecta
- Order: Coleoptera
- Suborder: Polyphaga
- Infraorder: Cucujiformia
- Family: Cerambycidae
- Genus: Aconopterus
- Species: A. cristatipennis

Binomial name
- Aconopterus cristatipennis Blanchard in Gay, 1851

Species of beetle

Aconopterus cristatipennis is a species of beetle in the family Cerambycidae. It was described by Blanchard in 1851. It is known from Chile.
