= Aconopterus strandi =

Scientific classification
- Kingdom: Animalia
- Phylum: Arthropoda
- Class: Insecta
- Order: Coleoptera
- Suborder: Polyphaga
- Infraorder: Cucujiformia
- Family: Cerambycidae
- Genus: Aconopterus
- Species: A. strandi

Binomial name
- Aconopterus strandi Breuning, 1943

Species of beetle

Aconopterus strandi is a species of beetle in the family Cerambycidae. It was described by Breuning in 1943. It is known from Chile.
