= Pseudostyne =

Scientific classification
- Kingdom: Animalia
- Phylum: Arthropoda
- Class: Insecta
- Order: Coleoptera
- Suborder: Polyphaga
- Infraorder: Cucujiformia
- Family: Cerambycidae
- Tribe: Desmiphorini
- Genus: Pseudostyne

Genus of beetles

Pseudostyne is a genus of longhorn beetles of the subfamily Lamiinae, containing the following species:

- Pseudostyne alboplagiata Breuning, 1940
- Pseudostyne ratovosoni Breuning, 1970
