= Microrhodopis rufipennis =

Scientific classification
- Kingdom: Animalia
- Phylum: Arthropoda
- Class: Insecta
- Order: Coleoptera
- Suborder: Polyphaga
- Infraorder: Cucujiformia
- Family: Cerambycidae
- Genus: Microrhodopis
- Species: M. rufipennis

Binomial name
- Microrhodopis rufipennis Breuning, 1957

Species of beetle

Microrhodopis rufipennis is a species of beetle in the family Cerambycidae. It was described by Stephan von Breuning in 1957.
