= Microrhodopis albovittata =

Scientific classification
- Kingdom: Animalia
- Phylum: Arthropoda
- Class: Insecta
- Order: Coleoptera
- Suborder: Polyphaga
- Infraorder: Cucujiformia
- Family: Cerambycidae
- Genus: Microrhodopis
- Species: M. albovittata

Binomial name
- Microrhodopis albovittata Breuning, 1976

Species of beetle

Microrhodopis albovittata is a species of beetle in the family Cerambycidae. It was described by Stephan von Breuning in 1976.
