= Microrhodopis =

Scientific classification
- Kingdom: Animalia
- Phylum: Arthropoda
- Class: Insecta
- Order: Coleoptera
- Suborder: Polyphaga
- Infraorder: Cucujiformia
- Family: Cerambycidae
- Subfamily: Lamiinae
- Genus: Microrhodopis; Breuning, 1957

Genus of beetles

Microrhodopis is a genus of longhorn beetles of the subfamily Lamiinae, containing two species:

- Microrhodopis albovittata Breuning, 1976
- Microrhodopis rufipennis Breuning, 1957
