= Parischnolea =

Scientific classification
- Kingdom: Animalia
- Phylum: Arthropoda
- Class: Insecta
- Order: Coleoptera
- Suborder: Polyphaga
- Infraorder: Cucujiformia
- Family: Cerambycidae
- Tribe: Desmiphorini
- Genus: Parischnolea

Genus of beetles

Parischnolea is a genus of longhorn beetles of the subfamily Lamiinae, containing the following species:

- Parischnolea excavata Breuning, 1942
- Parischnolea jatai Martins & Galileo, 1995
