= Parischnolea jatai =

Scientific classification
- Kingdom: Animalia
- Phylum: Arthropoda
- Class: Insecta
- Order: Coleoptera
- Suborder: Polyphaga
- Infraorder: Cucujiformia
- Family: Cerambycidae
- Genus: Parischnolea
- Species: P. jatai

Binomial name
- Parischnolea jatai Martins & Galileo, 1995

Species of beetle

Parischnolea jatai is a species of beetle in the family Cerambycidae. It was described by Martins and Galileo in 1995. It is known from Brazil.
