= Mimomorpha clytiformis =

Scientific classification
- Kingdom: Animalia
- Phylum: Arthropoda
- Class: Insecta
- Order: Coleoptera
- Suborder: Polyphaga
- Infraorder: Cucujiformia
- Family: Cerambycidae
- Genus: Mimomorpha
- Species: M. clytiformis

Binomial name
- Mimomorpha clytiformis Newman, 1842

Species of beetle

Mimomorpha clytiformis is a species of beetle in the family Cerambycidae. It was described by Newman in 1842.
