= Mimomorpha =

Scientific classification
- Kingdom: Animalia
- Phylum: Arthropoda
- Class: Insecta
- Order: Coleoptera
- Suborder: Polyphaga
- Infraorder: Cucujiformia
- Family: Cerambycidae
- Tribe: Desmiphorini
- Genus: Mimomorpha

Genus of beetles

Mimomorpha is a genus of longhorn beetles of the subfamily Lamiinae, containing the following species:

- Mimomorpha clytiformis Newman, 1842
- Mimomorpha flavopunctata Breuning, 1980
