= Piruana =

Scientific classification
- Kingdom: Animalia
- Phylum: Arthropoda
- Class: Insecta
- Order: Coleoptera
- Suborder: Polyphaga
- Infraorder: Cucujiformia
- Family: Cerambycidae
- Tribe: Desmiphorini
- Genus: Piruana

Genus of beetles

Piruana is a genus of longhorn beetles of the subfamily Lamiinae, containing the following species:

- Piruana pulchra Martins, Galileo & de Oliveira, 2009
- Piruana tuberosa Galileo & Martins, 1998
