= Scaposerixia =

Scientific classification
- Kingdom: Animalia
- Phylum: Arthropoda
- Class: Insecta
- Order: Coleoptera
- Suborder: Polyphaga
- Infraorder: Cucujiformia
- Family: Cerambycidae
- Tribe: Desmiphorini
- Genus: Scaposerixia

Genus of beetles

Scaposerixia is a genus of longhorn beetles of the subfamily Lamiinae, containing the following species:

- Scaposerixia bicolor (Pic, 1926)
- Scaposerixia pubicollis (Pic, 1932)
