= Scaposerixia pubicollis =

Scientific classification
- Kingdom: Animalia
- Phylum: Arthropoda
- Class: Insecta
- Order: Coleoptera
- Suborder: Polyphaga
- Infraorder: Cucujiformia
- Family: Cerambycidae
- Genus: Scaposerixia
- Species: S. pubicollis

Binomial name
- Scaposerixia pubicollis (Pic, 1932)

Species of beetle

Scaposerixia pubicollis is a species of beetle in the family Cerambycidae. It was described by Pic in 1932.
