= Etyma icima =

Scientific classification
- Kingdom: Animalia
- Phylum: Arthropoda
- Class: Insecta
- Order: Coleoptera
- Suborder: Polyphaga
- Infraorder: Cucujiformia
- Family: Cerambycidae
- Genus: Etyma
- Species: E. icima

Binomial name
- Etyma icima Galileo & Martins, 2012

Species of beetle

Etyma icima is a species of beetle in the family Cerambycidae. It was described by Galileo and Martins in 2012.
