= Etyma =

Scientific classification
- Kingdom: Animalia
- Phylum: Arthropoda
- Class: Insecta
- Order: Coleoptera
- Suborder: Polyphaga
- Infraorder: Cucujiformia
- Family: Cerambycidae
- Tribe: Desmiphorini
- Genus: Etyma

Genus of beetles

Etyma is a genus of longhorn beetles of the subfamily Lamiinae, containing the following species:

- Etyma curu Galileo & Martins, 2012
- Etyma icima Galileo & Martins, 2012

"Etyma" is also the plural of "etymon," a root word in a proto-language.
