= Paramblymora =

Scientific classification
- Kingdom: Animalia
- Phylum: Arthropoda
- Class: Insecta
- Order: Coleoptera
- Suborder: Polyphaga
- Infraorder: Cucujiformia
- Family: Cerambycidae
- Tribe: Desmiphorini
- Genus: Paramblymora

Genus of beetles

Paramblymora is a genus of longhorn beetles of the subfamily Lamiinae, containing the following species:

- Paramblymora affinis Breuning, 1974
- Paramblymora sarasini Breuning, 1961
