= Essisus vivesi =

Scientific classification
- Kingdom: Animalia
- Phylum: Arthropoda
- Class: Insecta
- Order: Coleoptera
- Suborder: Polyphaga
- Infraorder: Cucujiformia
- Family: Cerambycidae
- Genus: Essisus
- Species: E. vivesi

Binomial name
- Essisus vivesi Breuning, 1978

Species of beetle

Essisus vivesi is a species of beetle in the family Cerambycidae. It was described by Stephan von Breuning in 1978. It is known from Australia.
