= Essisus dispar =

Scientific classification
- Kingdom: Animalia
- Phylum: Arthropoda
- Class: Insecta
- Order: Coleoptera
- Suborder: Polyphaga
- Infraorder: Cucujiformia
- Family: Cerambycidae
- Genus: Essisus
- Species: E. dispar

Binomial name
- Essisus dispar Pascoe, 1866

Species of beetle

Essisus dispar is a species of beetle in the family Cerambycidae. It was described by Pascoe in 1866. It is known from Australia.
