= Ceiupaba =

Scientific classification
- Domain: Eukaryota
- Kingdom: Animalia
- Phylum: Arthropoda
- Class: Insecta
- Order: Coleoptera
- Suborder: Polyphaga
- Infraorder: Cucujiformia
- Family: Cerambycidae
- Tribe: Desmiphorini
- Genus: Ceiupaba; Martins & Galileo, 1998

Species
- Ceiupaba lineata Martins & Galileo, 1998; Ceiupaba poranga Martins, Galileo & Santos-Silva, 2015

Genus of insects

Ceiupaba is a genus of cerambycid beetle. There are two species recognized in this genus.
