= Ceiupaba lineata =

Scientific classification
- Domain: Eukaryota
- Kingdom: Animalia
- Phylum: Arthropoda
- Class: Insecta
- Order: Coleoptera
- Suborder: Polyphaga
- Infraorder: Cucujiformia
- Family: Cerambycidae
- Genus: Ceiupaba
- Species: C. lineata

Binomial name
- Ceiupaba lineata Martins & Galileo, 1998

Genus of beetles

Ceiupaba lineata is a species of beetle in the family Cerambycidae, and is one of two species in the genus Ceiupaba. It was described by Martins and Galileo in 1998.
