= Velorini =

Scientific classification
- Domain: Eukaryota
- Kingdom: Animalia
- Phylum: Arthropoda
- Class: Insecta
- Order: Coleoptera
- Suborder: Polyphaga
- Infraorder: Cucujiformia
- Family: Cerambycidae
- Subfamily: Lamiinae
- Tribe: Velorini; Thomson, 1864

Tribe of beetles

Velorini is a tribe of longhorn beetles of the subfamily Lamiinae. It was described by Thomson in 1864.

== Taxonomy ==
- Parapolyacanthia Breuning, 1951
- Phyxium Pascoe, 1864
- Probatodes Thomson, 1864
- Velora Thomson, 1864
