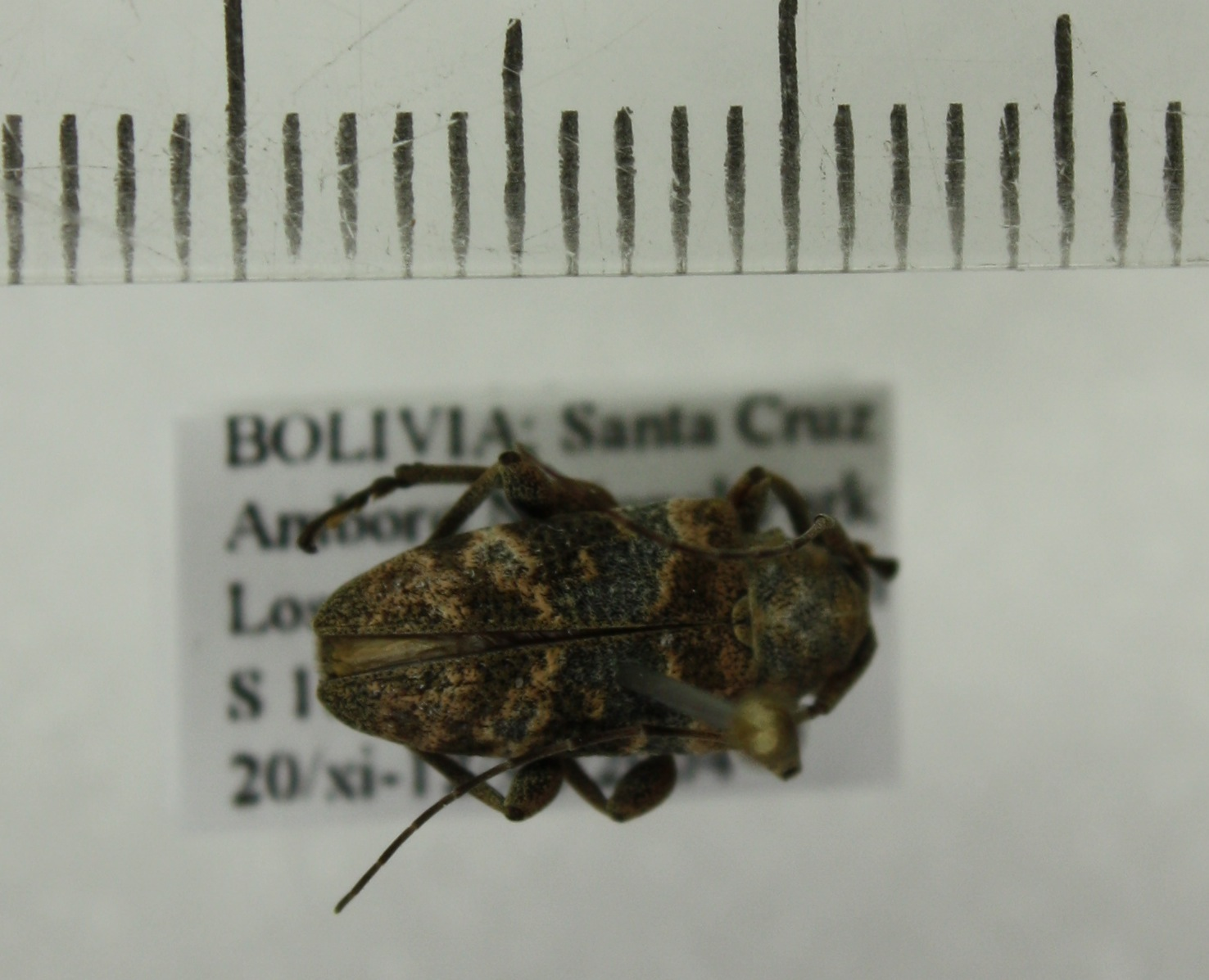
- A beetle of the species Xenofrea trigonalis Bates.

Scientific classification
- Kingdom: Animalia
- Phylum: Arthropoda
- Class: Insecta
- Order: Coleoptera
- Suborder: Polyphaga
- Infraorder: Cucujiformia
- Family: Cerambycidae
- Subfamily: Lamiinae
- Tribe: Xenofreini; Aurivillius, 1923

= Xenofreini =

Tribe of beetles

Xenofreini is a tribe of longhorn beetles of the subfamily Lamiinae.

== Taxonomy ==
- Curiofrea
- Oroxenofrea
- Xenofrea
