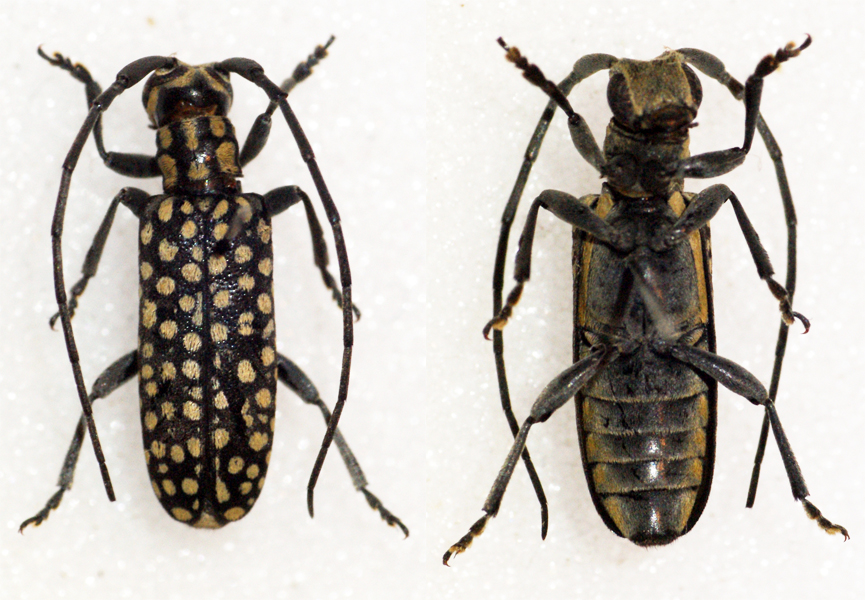
- Eunidia guttulata

Scientific classification
- Domain: Eukaryota
- Kingdom: Animalia
- Phylum: Arthropoda
- Class: Insecta
- Order: Coleoptera
- Suborder: Polyphaga
- Infraorder: Cucujiformia
- Family: Cerambycidae
- Subfamily: Lamiinae
- Tribe: Eunidiini; Téocchi et al., 2010

= Eunidiini =

Tribe of beetles

Eunidiini is a tribe of longhorn beetles of the subfamily Lamiinae. It was described by Téocchi et al. in 2010.

== Taxonomy ==
- Eunidia Erichson, 1843
- Eunidiella Breuning, 1940
- Eunidiopsis Breuning, 1939
