= Emphytoeciini =

Scientific classification
- Domain: Eukaryota
- Kingdom: Animalia
- Phylum: Arthropoda
- Class: Insecta
- Order: Coleoptera
- Suborder: Polyphaga
- Infraorder: Cucujiformia
- Family: Cerambycidae
- Subfamily: Lamiinae
- Tribe: Emphytoeciini; Lacordaire, 1872

Tribe of beetles

Emphytoeciini is a tribe of longhorn beetles of the subfamily Lamiinae. It was described by Lacordaire in 1872.

== Taxonomy ==
- Emphytoecia Fairmaire & Germain, 1859
- Itheum Pascoe, 1864
