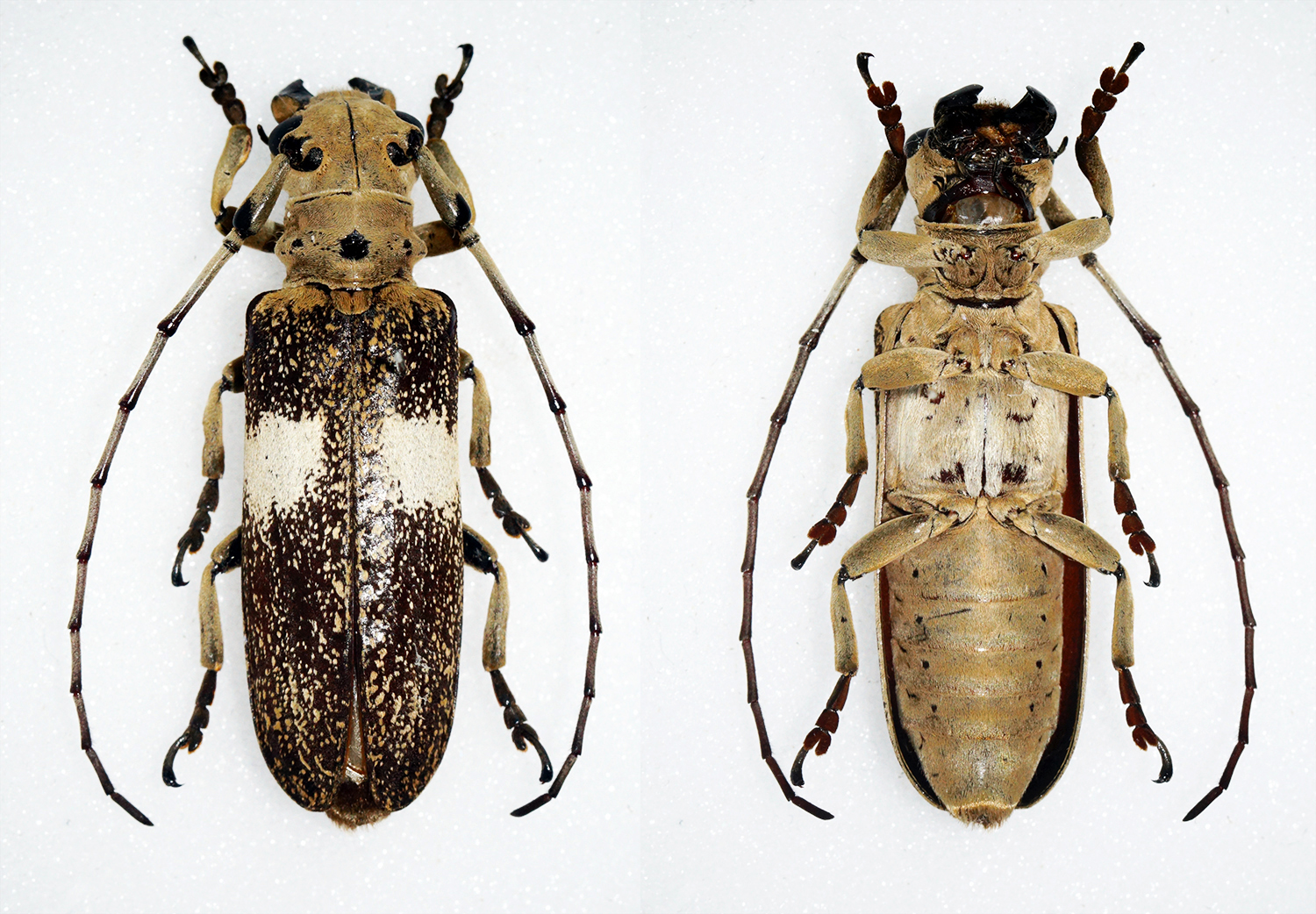
- Lane,1959 Sex: Female Data: 15-09-12 - Route de Kaw - French Guyana (Size: 31.5mm)

Scientific classification
- Domain: Eukaryota
- Kingdom: Animalia
- Phylum: Arthropoda
- Class: Insecta
- Order: Coleoptera
- Suborder: Polyphaga
- Infraorder: Cucujiformia
- Family: Cerambycidae
- Subfamily: Lamiinae
- Tribe: Laticraniini; Lane, 1959

= Laticraniini =

Tribe of beetles

Laticraniini is a tribe of longhorn beetles of the subfamily Lamiinae.

== Taxonomy ==
- Amplitempora
- Laticranium
