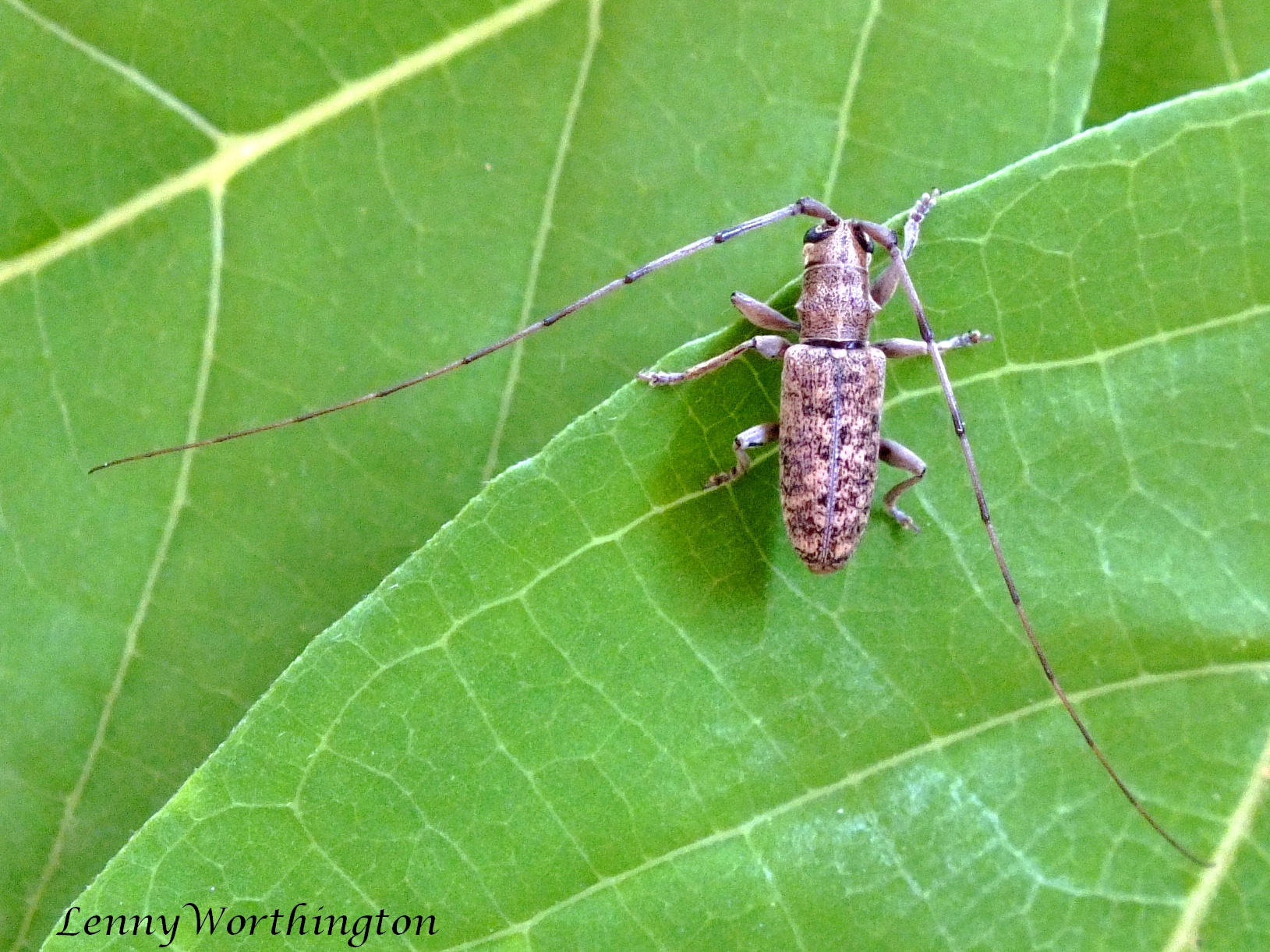
- Xenolea asiatica

Scientific classification
- Domain: Eukaryota
- Kingdom: Animalia
- Phylum: Arthropoda
- Class: Insecta
- Order: Coleoptera
- Suborder: Polyphaga
- Infraorder: Cucujiformia
- Family: Cerambycidae
- Subfamily: Lamiinae
- Tribe: Xenoleini; Lacordaire, 1869

= Xenoleini =

Tribe of beetles

Xenoleini is a tribe of longhorn beetles of the subfamily Lamiinae. It was described by Lacordaire in 1869.

== Taxonomy ==
- Hirtaeschopalaea Pic, 1925
- Paraxenolea Breuning, 1950
- Xenolea Thomson, 1864
