= Crinotarsini =

Scientific classification
- Domain: Eukaryota
- Kingdom: Animalia
- Phylum: Arthropoda
- Class: Insecta
- Order: Coleoptera
- Suborder: Polyphaga
- Infraorder: Cucujiformia
- Family: Cerambycidae
- Subfamily: Lamiinae
- Tribe: Crinotarsini; Lacordaire, 1872

Genera
- See text

Tribe of beetles

Crinotarsini is a tribe of longhorn beetles of the subfamily Lamiinae. It was described by Lacordaire in 1872.

== Genera ==
The tribe includes the following genera:

- Crinotarsus Blanchard, 1853
- Sormida Gahan, 1888
