= Hirtaeschopalaea =

Scientific classification
- Kingdom: Animalia
- Phylum: Arthropoda
- Class: Insecta
- Order: Coleoptera
- Suborder: Polyphaga
- Infraorder: Cucujiformia
- Family: Cerambycidae
- Subfamily: Lamiinae
- Tribe: Xenoleini
- Genus: Hirtaeschopalaea; Pic, 1925

Genus of beetles

Hirtaeschopalaea is a genus of longhorn beetles of the subfamily Lamiinae, containing the following species:

- Hirtaeschopalaea albolineata Pic, 1925
- Hirtaeschopalaea borneensis Breuning, 1963
- Hirtaeschopalaea celebensis Breuning, 1969
- Hirtaeschopalaea dorsana Holzschuh, 1999
- Hirtaeschopalaea fasciculata Breuning, 1938
- Hirtaeschopalaea nubila (Matsushita, 1933)
- Hirtaeschopalaea robusta Breuning, 1938
