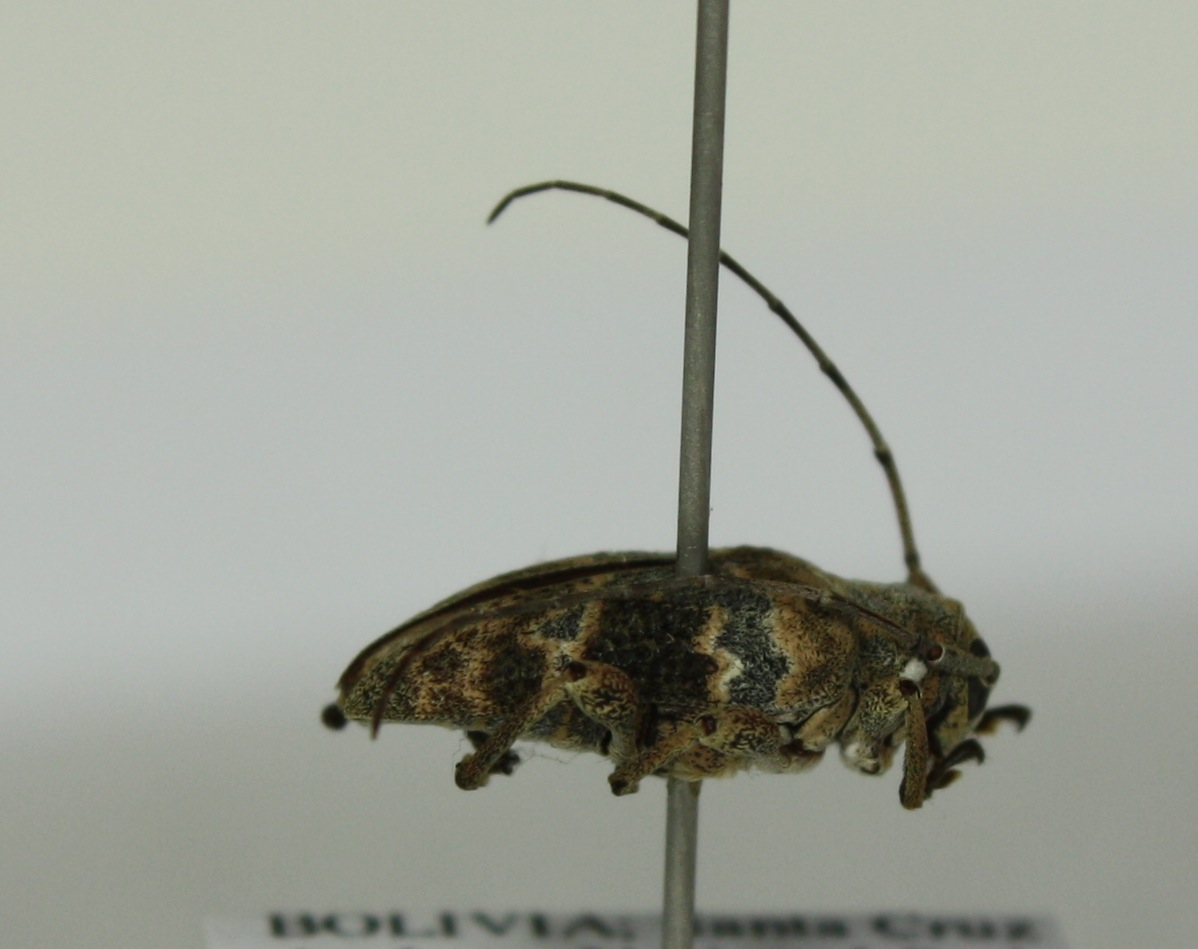
- Xenofrea trigonalis Bates, 1885

Scientific classification
- Kingdom: Animalia
- Phylum: Arthropoda
- Class: Insecta
- Order: Coleoptera
- Suborder: Polyphaga
- Infraorder: Cucujiformia
- Family: Cerambycidae
- Subfamily: Lamiinae
- Tribe: Xenofreini
- Genus: Xenofrea; Bates, 1885

= Xenofrea =

Genus of beetles

Xenofrea is a genus of longhorn beetles of the subfamily Lamiinae, containing the following species:

- Xenofrea albofasciata Galileo & Martins, 2001
- Xenofrea anomala Bates, 1885
- Xenofrea anoreina Tavakilian & Néouze, 2006
- Xenofrea apicalis Melzer, 1931
- Xenofrea aragua Tavakilian & Néouze, 2006
- Xenofrea arcifera Néouze & Tavakilian, 2005
- Xenofrea areolata Bates, 1885
- Xenofrea basitriangularis Néouze & Tavakilian, 2005
- Xenofrea berkovi Néouze & Tavakilian, 2005
- Xenofrea bicincta Tavakilian & Néouze, 2006
- Xenofrea camixaima Galileo & Martins, 2006
- Xenofrea cretacea Néouze & Tavakilian, 2005
- Xenofrea dechambrei Néouze & Tavakilian, 2005
- Xenofrea diagonalis Martins & Galileo, 2010
- Xenofrea durantoni Néouze & Tavakilian, 2005
- Xenofrea enriquezae Tavakilian & Néouze, 2006
- Xenofrea exotica Galileo & Martins, 1999
- Xenofrea favus Tavakilian & Néouze, 2006
- Xenofrea fractanulis Tavakilian & Néouze, 2006
- Xenofrea fulgida Galileo & Martins, 2001
- Xenofrea griseocincta Tavakilian & Néouze, 2006
- Xenofrea guttata Galileo & Martins, 2006
- Xenofrea hovorei Néouze & Tavakilian, 2005
- Xenofrea inermis Néouze & Tavakilian, 2005
- Xenofrea larrei Néouze & Tavakilian, 2005
- Xenofrea lineatipennis Zajciw, 1961
- Xenofrea lupa Tavakilian & Néouze, 2006
- Xenofrea magdalenae Néouze & Tavakilian, 2005
- Xenofrea mariahelenae Tavakilian & Néouze, 2006
- Xenofrea martinsi Tavakilian & Néouze, 2006
- Xenofrea mascara Néouze & Tavakilian, 2005
- Xenofrea monnei Tavakilian & Néouze, 2006
- Xenofrea morvanae Néouze & Tavakilian, 2005
- Xenofrea murina Néouze & Tavakilian, 2005
- Xenofrea nana Galileo & Martins, 2006
- Xenofrea obscura Galileo & Martins, 2006
- Xenofrea ocellata Tavakilian & Néouze, 2006
- Xenofrea picta Tavakilian & Néouze, 2006
- Xenofrea proxima Néouze & Tavakilian, 2005
- Xenofrea pseudomurina Tavakilian & Néouze, 2006
- Xenofrea puma Néouze & Tavakilian, 2005
- Xenofrea punctata Galileo & Martins, 2006
- Xenofrea rogueti Néouze & Tavakilian, 2005
- Xenofrea seabrai Tavakilian & Néouze, 2006
- Xenofrea senecauxi Néouze & Tavakilian, 2005
- Xenofrea soukai Néouze & Tavakilian, 2005
- Xenofrea tavakiliani Dalens, Touroult & Giuglaris, 2009
- Xenofrea trigonalis Bates, 1885
- Xenofrea veronicae Dalens, Touroult & Giuglaris, 2009
- Xenofrea zonata Bates, 1885
