= Acalolepta loriai =

Scientific classification
- Kingdom: Animalia
- Phylum: Arthropoda
- Class: Insecta
- Order: Coleoptera
- Suborder: Polyphaga
- Infraorder: Cucujiformia
- Family: Cerambycidae
- Genus: Acalolepta
- Species: A. loriai

Binomial name
- Acalolepta loriai (Breuning, 1950)

Synonyms
- Cypriola loriai Breuning, 1950

Species of beetle

Acalolepta loriai is a species of beetle in the family Cerambycidae. It was described by Stephan von Breuning in 1950, originally under the genus Cypriola. It is known from Papua New Guinea.
