= Eudryoctenes =

Scientific classification
- Domain: Eukaryota
- Kingdom: Animalia
- Phylum: Arthropoda
- Class: Insecta
- Order: Coleoptera
- Suborder: Polyphaga
- Infraorder: Cucujiformia
- Family: Cerambycidae
- Tribe: Polyrhaphidini
- Genus: Eudryoctenes

Genus of beetles

Eudryoctenes is a genus of longhorn beetles of the subfamily Lamiinae, containing the following species:

- Eudryoctenes africanus (Jordan, 1903)
- Eudryoctenes spinipennis Breuning, 1978
