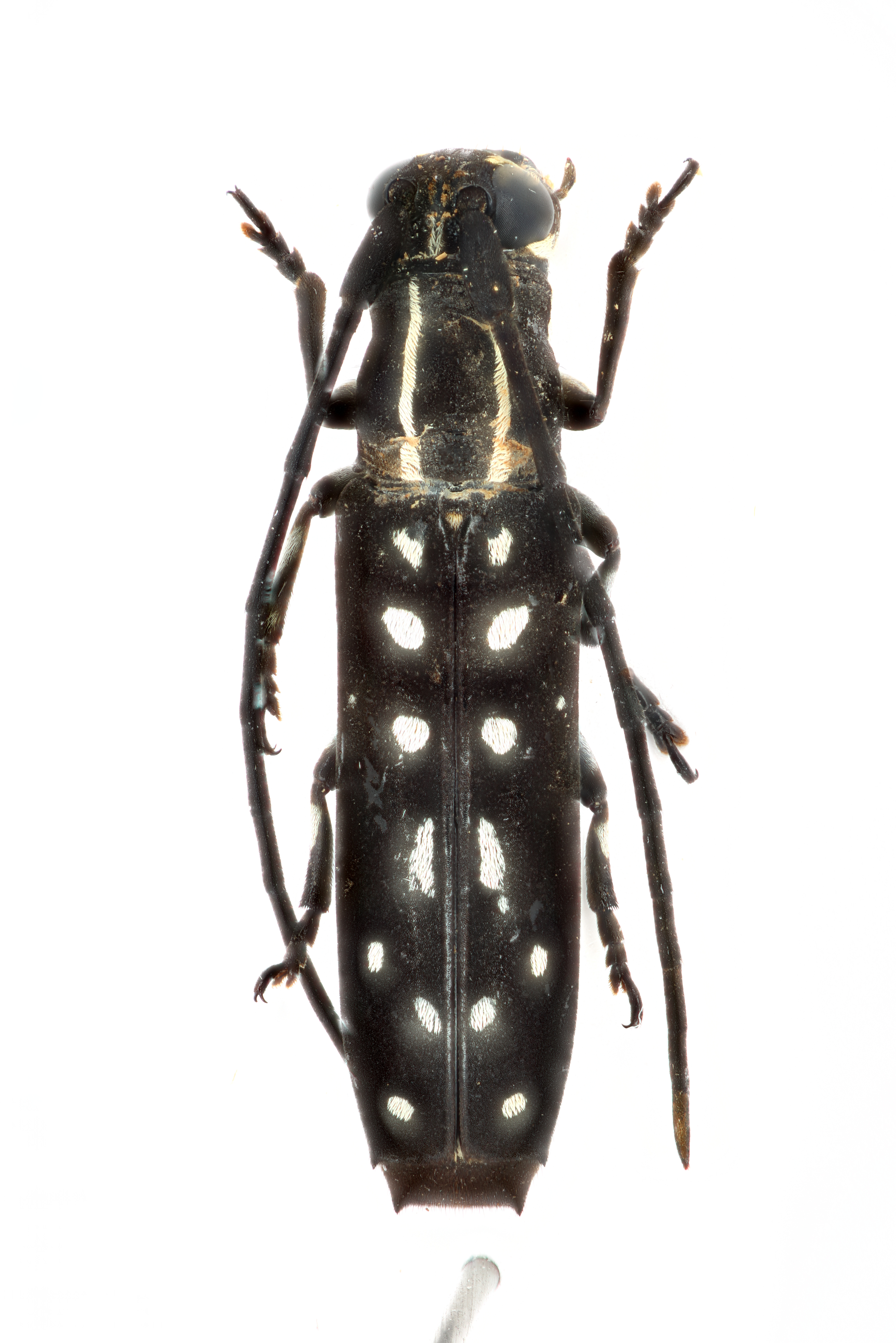

Scientific classification
- Domain: Eukaryota
- Kingdom: Animalia
- Phylum: Arthropoda
- Class: Insecta
- Order: Coleoptera
- Suborder: Polyphaga
- Infraorder: Cucujiformia
- Family: Cerambycidae
- Genus: Proctocera
- Species: P. senegalensis

Binomial name
- Proctocera senegalensis (Thomson, 1857)

Synonyms
- Clinia senegalensis Thomson, 1857

= Proctocera senegalensis =

Species of beetle

Proctocera senegalensis is a species of beetle in the family Cerambycidae. It was described by James Thomson in 1857, originally under the genus Clinia. It is known from the Democratic Republic of the Congo, Liberia, the Ivory Coast, Cameroon, Togo, and Senegal.
