= Crinotarsus =

Scientific classification
- Kingdom: Animalia
- Phylum: Arthropoda
- Class: Insecta
- Order: Coleoptera
- Suborder: Polyphaga
- Infraorder: Cucujiformia
- Family: Cerambycidae
- Tribe: Desmiphorini
- Genus: Crinotarsus

Genus of beetles

Crinotarsus is a genus of longhorn beetles of the subfamily Lamiinae.

- Crinotarsus plagiatus Blanchard, 1853
- Crinotarsus sulcatus Breuning, 1947
