= Emphytoecia sutura-alba =

Scientific classification
- Kingdom: Animalia
- Phylum: Arthropoda
- Class: Insecta
- Order: Coleoptera
- Suborder: Polyphaga
- Infraorder: Cucujiformia
- Family: Cerambycidae
- Genus: Emphytoecia
- Species: E. sutura-alba

Binomial name
- Emphytoecia sutura-alba Fairmaie & Germain, 1859

Synonyms
- Emphytoecia sutura-alba Fairmaie & Germain, 1859

Species of beetle

Emphytoecia sutura-alba is a species of beetle in the family Cerambycidae. It was described by Fairmaie and Germain in 1859 and is known from Chile.
