= Microcymatura macrophthalma =

Scientific classification
- Kingdom: Animalia
- Phylum: Arthropoda
- Class: Insecta
- Order: Coleoptera
- Suborder: Polyphaga
- Infraorder: Cucujiformia
- Family: Cerambycidae
- Genus: Microcymatura
- Species: M. macrophthalma

Binomial name
- Microcymatura macrophthalma Báguena & Breuning, 1958

Species of beetle

Microcymatura macrophthalma is a species of beetle in the family Cerambycidae. It was described by Báguena and Stephan von Breuning in 1958.
