= Velora ciliata =

Scientific classification
- Kingdom: Animalia
- Phylum: Arthropoda
- Class: Insecta
- Order: Coleoptera
- Suborder: Polyphaga
- Infraorder: Cucujiformia
- Family: Cerambycidae
- Genus: Velora
- Species: V. ciliata

Binomial name
- Velora ciliata Breuning, 1931

Species of beetle

Velora ciliata is a species of beetle in the family Cerambycidae. It was described by Stephan von Breuning in 1931. It is known from Australia.
