= Nyctimenius tristis =

Scientific classification
- Kingdom: Animalia
- Phylum: Arthropoda
- Clade: Pancrustacea
- Class: Insecta
- Order: Coleoptera
- Suborder: Polyphaga
- Infraorder: Cucujiformia
- Family: Cerambycidae
- Genus: Nyctimenius
- Species: N. tristis

Binomial name
- Nyctimenius tristis (Fabricius, 1792)

Synonyms
- Nyctimene testaceovittata Pic, 1926; Nyctimene tristis (Fabricius, 1793); Nyctimene vittata Pascoe, 1866; Saperda lineata Schönherr, 1817 nec Fabricius, 1792; Saperda tristis Fabricius, 1792 nec 1775

Species of beetle

Nyctimenius tristis is a species of beetle in the family Cerambycidae. It was described by Johan Christian Fabricius in 1792, originally under the genus Saperda. It is known from Malaysia, Myanmar, India, Laos, the Philippines, Nepal, Thailand, China, Singapore, and Vietnam.
