= Elytracanthina pugionata =

Scientific classification
- Kingdom: Animalia
- Phylum: Arthropoda
- Class: Insecta
- Order: Coleoptera
- Suborder: Polyphaga
- Infraorder: Cucujiformia
- Family: Cerambycidae
- Genus: Elytracanthina
- Species: E. pugionata

Binomial name
- Elytracanthina pugionata (Lane, 1955)

Synonyms
- Elytracantha pugionata Lane, 1955

Species of beetle

Elytracanthina pugionata is a species of beetle in the family Cerambycidae. It was described by Lane in 1955. It is known from Brazil.
