= Proctocera quadriguttata =

Scientific classification
- Domain: Eukaryota
- Kingdom: Animalia
- Phylum: Arthropoda
- Class: Insecta
- Order: Coleoptera
- Suborder: Polyphaga
- Infraorder: Cucujiformia
- Family: Cerambycidae
- Genus: Proctocera
- Species: P. quadriguttata

Binomial name
- Proctocera quadriguttata Aurivillius, 1914

Species of beetle

Proctocera quadriguttata is a species of beetle in the family Cerambycidae. It was described by Per Olof Christopher Aurivillius in 1914. It is known from Gabon, the Democratic Republic of the Congo, and Uganda.
