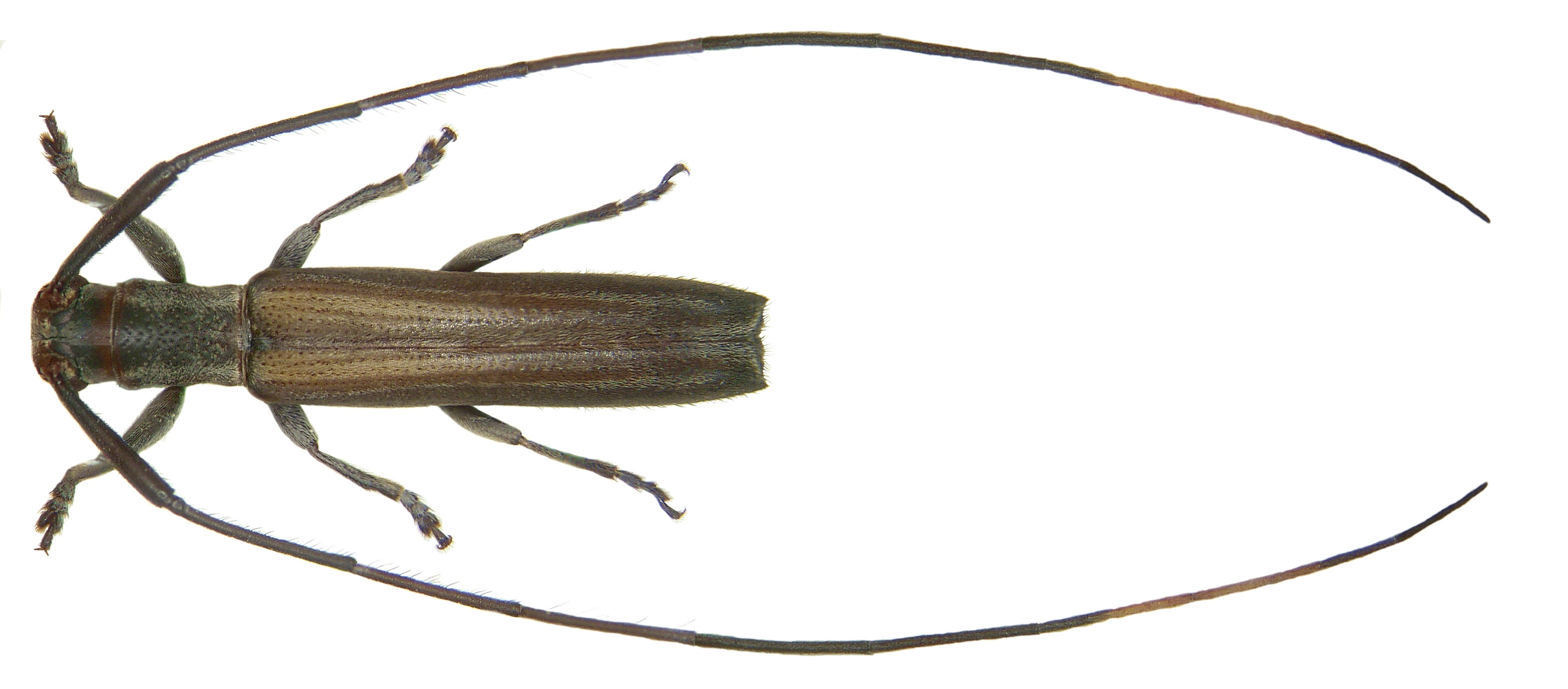

Scientific classification
- Kingdom: Animalia
- Phylum: Arthropoda
- Clade: Pancrustacea
- Class: Insecta
- Order: Coleoptera
- Suborder: Polyphaga
- Infraorder: Cucujiformia
- Family: Cerambycidae
- Genus: Nyctimenius
- Species: N. subsericeus

Binomial name
- Nyctimenius subsericeus (Pascoe, 1866)

Synonyms
- Nyctimene subsericea Pascoe, 1866; Nyctimenius subsericea (Pascoe, 1866) (misspelling)

= Nyctimenius subsericeus =

Species of beetle

Nyctimenius subsericeus is a species of beetle in the family Cerambycidae. It was described by Francis Polkinghorne Pascoe in 1866. It is known from Sulawesi and Malaysia.
