= Acridocephala nicoletii =

Scientific classification
- Kingdom: Animalia
- Phylum: Arthropoda
- Clade: Pancrustacea
- Class: Insecta
- Order: Coleoptera
- Suborder: Polyphaga
- Infraorder: Cucujiformia
- Family: Cerambycidae
- Genus: Acridocephala
- Species: A. nicoletii

Binomial name
- Acridocephala nicoletii Thomson, 1858

Synonyms
- Acridocephala nicoleti Jordan, 1903

Species of beetle

Acridocephala nicoletii is a species of beetle in the family Cerambycidae. It was described by James Thomson in 1858. It is known from Gabon.
