= Cloniocerus lamellicornis =

Scientific classification
- Kingdom: Animalia
- Phylum: Arthropoda
- Class: Insecta
- Order: Coleoptera
- Suborder: Polyphaga
- Infraorder: Cucujiformia
- Family: Cerambycidae
- Genus: Cloniocerus
- Species: C. lamellicornis

Binomial name
- Cloniocerus lamellicornis Breuning, 1950

Synonyms
- Cloniocerus kenyensis Breuning, 1950

Species of beetle

Cloniocerus lamellicornis is a species of beetle in the family Cerambycidae. It was described by Stephan von Breuning in 1950. It is known from Kenya.
