= Microcymatura discalis =

Scientific classification
- Kingdom: Animalia
- Phylum: Arthropoda
- Class: Insecta
- Order: Coleoptera
- Suborder: Polyphaga
- Infraorder: Cucujiformia
- Family: Cerambycidae
- Genus: Microcymatura
- Species: M. discalis

Binomial name
- Microcymatura discalis Breuning, 1968

Species of beetle

Microcymatura discalis is a species of beetle in the family Cerambycidae. It was described by Stephan von Breuning in 1968.
