= Emphytoecia niveopicta =

Scientific classification
- Kingdom: Animalia
- Phylum: Arthropoda
- Class: Insecta
- Order: Coleoptera
- Suborder: Polyphaga
- Infraorder: Cucujiformia
- Family: Cerambycidae
- Genus: Emphytoecia
- Species: E. niveopicta

Binomial name
- Emphytoecia niveopicta Fairmaie & Germain, 1864

Species of beetle

Emphytoecia niveopicta is a species of beetle in the family Cerambycidae. It was described by Fairmaie and Germain in 1864. It is known from Chile.
