= Hirtaeschopalaea dorsana =

Scientific classification
- Domain: Eukaryota
- Kingdom: Animalia
- Phylum: Arthropoda
- Class: Insecta
- Order: Coleoptera
- Suborder: Polyphaga
- Infraorder: Cucujiformia
- Family: Cerambycidae
- Genus: Hirtaeschopalaea
- Species: H. dorsana

Binomial name
- Hirtaeschopalaea dorsana Holzschuh, 1999

Species of beetle

Hirtaeschopalaea dorsana is a species of beetle in the family Cerambycidae. It was described by Carolus Holzschuh in 1999.
