= Cloniocerus ochripennis =

Scientific classification
- Kingdom: Animalia
- Phylum: Arthropoda
- Class: Insecta
- Order: Coleoptera
- Suborder: Polyphaga
- Infraorder: Cucujiformia
- Family: Cerambycidae
- Genus: Cloniocerus
- Species: C. ochripennis

Binomial name
- Cloniocerus ochripennis Breuning, 1940

Species of beetle

Cloniocerus ochripennis is a species of beetle in the family Cerambycidae. It was described by Breuning in 1940. It is known from Tanzania.
