= Hirtaeschopalaea albolineata =

Scientific classification
- Kingdom: Animalia
- Phylum: Arthropoda
- Class: Insecta
- Order: Coleoptera
- Suborder: Polyphaga
- Infraorder: Cucujiformia
- Family: Cerambycidae
- Genus: Hirtaeschopalaea
- Species: H. albolineata

Binomial name
- Hirtaeschopalaea albolineata Pic, 1925

Synonyms
- Hirteschopalaea albolineata Pic, 1925

Species of beetle

Hirtaeschopalaea albolineata is a species of beetle in the family Cerambycidae. It was described by Maurice Pic in 1925. It is known from India, Vietnam, Borneo and Laos. Its body is typically black and yellowish brown with a gray and white belly.
