= Itheum villosum =

Scientific classification
- Domain: Eukaryota
- Kingdom: Animalia
- Phylum: Arthropoda
- Class: Insecta
- Order: Coleoptera
- Suborder: Polyphaga
- Infraorder: Cucujiformia
- Family: Cerambycidae
- Tribe: Pteropliini
- Genus: Itheum
- Species: I. villosum

Binomial name
- Itheum villosum Oke, 1932

Species of beetle

Itheum villosum is a species of beetle in the family Cerambycidae. It was described by Oke in 1932. It is known from Australia.
