= Parapolyacanthia trifolium =

Scientific classification
- Kingdom: Animalia
- Phylum: Arthropoda
- Class: Insecta
- Order: Coleoptera
- Suborder: Polyphaga
- Infraorder: Cucujiformia
- Family: Cerambycidae
- Genus: Parapolyacanthia
- Species: P. trifolium

Binomial name
- Parapolyacanthia trifolium (Fauvel, 1906)

Synonyms
- Polyacanthia trifolium Fauvel, 1906

Species of beetle

Parapolyacanthia trifolium is a species of beetle in the family Cerambycidae. It was described by Fauvel in 1906, originally under the genus Polyacanthia.
