= Cloniocerus constrictus =

Scientific classification
- Domain: Eukaryota
- Kingdom: Animalia
- Phylum: Arthropoda
- Class: Insecta
- Order: Coleoptera
- Suborder: Polyphaga
- Infraorder: Cucujiformia
- Family: Cerambycidae
- Genus: Cloniocerus
- Species: C. constrictus

Binomial name
- Cloniocerus constrictus Fahraeus, 1872

Species of beetle

Cloniocerus constrictus is a species of beetle in the family Cerambycidae. It was described by Fahraeus in 1872.
