= Nyctimenius ochraceovittatus =

Scientific classification
- Kingdom: Animalia
- Phylum: Arthropoda
- Class: Insecta
- Order: Coleoptera
- Suborder: Polyphaga
- Infraorder: Cucujiformia
- Family: Cerambycidae
- Genus: Nyctimenius
- Species: N. ochraceovittatus

Binomial name
- Nyctimenius ochraceovittatus (Aurivillius, 1922)

Synonyms
- Nyctimene ochraceovittata Aurivillius, 1922; Nyctimene ochraceovittata var. extrema Aurivillius, 1923; Nyctimene ochraceovittata var. intermedia Aurivillius, 1923; Nyctimenius ochraceovittata m. griseolineata Breuning, 1970; Nyctimenius ochraceovittatus ochraceovittatus (Aurivillius, 1922); Nyctimeninus ochraceovittata (Aurivillius, 1922) (misspelling); Nyctimenius ochraceovittata (Aurivillius, 1922) (misspelling); Nyctimenius ochraceovittata ochraceovittata (Aurivillius, 1922) (misspelling)

Species of beetle

Nyctimenius ochraceovittatus is a species of beetle in the family Cerambycidae. It was described by Per Olof Christopher Aurivillius in 1922, originally under the genus Nyctimene. It is known from Borneo, Malaysia and the Philippines.
