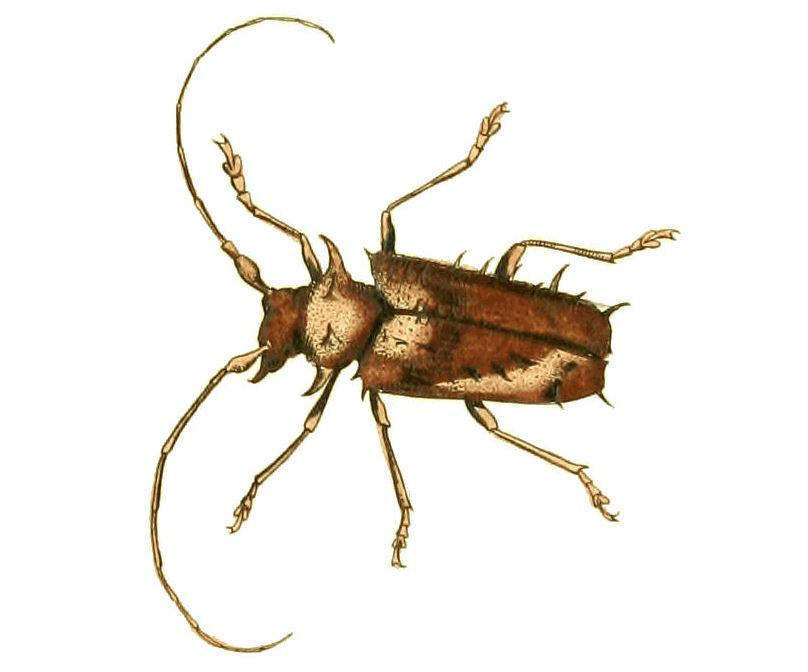
- Polyrhaphis spinosa

Scientific classification
- Domain: Eukaryota
- Kingdom: Animalia
- Phylum: Arthropoda
- Class: Insecta
- Order: Coleoptera
- Suborder: Polyphaga
- Infraorder: Cucujiformia
- Family: Cerambycidae
- Subfamily: Lamiinae
- Tribe: Polyrhaphidini; Thomson, 1860

= Polyrhaphidini =

Tribe of beetles

Polyrhaphidini is a tribe of longhorn beetles of the subfamily Lamiinae.

== Taxonomy ==
- Eudryoctenes
- Polyrhaphis
