= Heliolus =

Scientific classification
- Kingdom: Animalia
- Phylum: Arthropoda
- Class: Insecta
- Order: Coleoptera
- Suborder: Polyphaga
- Infraorder: Cucujiformia
- Family: Cerambycidae
- Subfamily: Lamiinae
- Tribe: Heliolini; Breuning, 1951
- Genus: Heliolus; Fauvel, 1907
- Species: H. brevicornis

Binomial name
- Heliolus brevicornis (Fauvel, 1906)

Genus of beetles

Heliolus brevicornis is a species of beetle in the family Cerambycidae, and the only species in the genus Heliolus, which in turn is the only genus in the tribe Heliolini. It was described by Fauvel in 1906.
