= Pretiliini =

Scientific classification
- Domain: Eukaryota
- Kingdom: Animalia
- Phylum: Arthropoda
- Class: Insecta
- Order: Coleoptera
- Suborder: Polyphaga
- Infraorder: Cucujiformia
- Family: Cerambycidae
- Subfamily: Lamiinae
- Tribe: Pretiliini; Martins & Galileo, 1990

Tribe of beetles

Pretiliini is a tribe of longhorn beetles of the subfamily Lamiinae. It contains a single genus, Pretilia, and a single species, Pretilia tuberculata.
