= Nyctimenius sabahensis =

Scientific classification
- Kingdom: Animalia
- Phylum: Arthropoda
- Class: Insecta
- Order: Coleoptera
- Suborder: Polyphaga
- Infraorder: Cucujiformia
- Family: Cerambycidae
- Genus: Nyctimenius
- Species: N. sabahensis

Binomial name
- Nyctimenius sabahensis (Hayashi, 1975)

Synonyms
- Pothyne sabahensis Hayashi, 1975

Species of beetle

Nyctimenius sabahensis is a species of beetle in the family Cerambycidae. It was described by Masao Hayashi in 1975. It is known from Borneo and Malaysia.
