= Sormida =

Scientific classification
- Kingdom: Animalia
- Phylum: Arthropoda
- Class: Insecta
- Order: Coleoptera
- Suborder: Polyphaga
- Infraorder: Cucujiformia
- Family: Cerambycidae
- Subfamily: Lamiinae
- Genus: Sormida; Gahan, 1888

Genus of beetles

Sormida is a genus of longhorn beetles of the subfamily Lamiinae.

Three species are assigned to this genus:

- Sormida cinerea Dillon & Dillon, 1952
- Sormida maculicollis (Thomson, 1865)
- Sormida ziczac Breuning, 1956
