= Phyxium lanatum =

Scientific classification
- Domain: Eukaryota
- Kingdom: Animalia
- Phylum: Arthropoda
- Class: Insecta
- Order: Coleoptera
- Suborder: Polyphaga
- Infraorder: Cucujiformia
- Family: Cerambycidae
- Genus: Phyxium
- Species: P. lanatum

Binomial name
- Phyxium lanatum Fauvel, 1906

Species of beetle

Phyxium lanatum is a species of beetle in the family Cerambycidae. It was described by Fauvel in 1906. It is known from New Caledonia.
