= Proctocera vittata =

Scientific classification
- Domain: Eukaryota
- Kingdom: Animalia
- Phylum: Arthropoda
- Class: Insecta
- Order: Coleoptera
- Suborder: Polyphaga
- Infraorder: Cucujiformia
- Family: Cerambycidae
- Genus: Proctocera
- Species: P. vittata

Binomial name
- Proctocera vittata Aurivillius, 1913

Species of beetle

Proctocera vittata is a species of beetle in the family Cerambycidae. It was described by Per Olof Christopher Aurivillius in 1913.
