= Proctocera =

Scientific classification
- Domain: Eukaryota
- Kingdom: Animalia
- Phylum: Arthropoda
- Class: Insecta
- Order: Coleoptera
- Suborder: Polyphaga
- Infraorder: Cucujiformia
- Family: Cerambycidae
- Tribe: Proctocerini; Aurivillius, 1921
- Genus: Proctocera; Chevrolat, 1855

Genus of beetles

Proctocerini is a tribe of longhorn beetles of the subfamily Lamiinae described by Per Olof Christopher Aurivillius in 1921. It contains a single genus, Proctocera, described by Louis Alexandre Auguste Chevrolat in 1855. That genus contains the following species:

- Proctocera lugubris Thomson, 1858
- Proctocera quadriguttata Aurivillius, 1914
- Proctocera scalaris Chevrolat, 1855
- Proctocera senegalensis (Thomson, 1857)
- Proctocera vittata Aurivillius, 1913
