= Velora sordida =

Scientific classification
- Domain: Eukaryota
- Kingdom: Animalia
- Phylum: Arthropoda
- Class: Insecta
- Order: Coleoptera
- Suborder: Polyphaga
- Infraorder: Cucujiformia
- Family: Cerambycidae
- Genus: Velora
- Species: V. sordida

Binomial name
- Velora sordida (Pascoe, 1863)

Synonyms
- Velora australis Thomson, 1864; Hebecerus sordidus Pascoe, 1863

Species of beetle

Velora sordida is a species of beetle in the family Cerambycidae, and the type species of its genus. It was described by Francis Polkinghorne Pascoe in 1863. It is known from Australia.
