= Cloniocerus albosticticus =

Scientific classification
- Kingdom: Animalia
- Phylum: Arthropoda
- Class: Insecta
- Order: Coleoptera
- Suborder: Polyphaga
- Infraorder: Cucujiformia
- Family: Cerambycidae
- Genus: Cloniocerus
- Species: C. albosticticus

Binomial name
- Cloniocerus albosticticus Breuning, 1940

Species of beetle

Cloniocerus albosticticus is a species of beetle in the family Cerambycidae. It was described by Breuning in 1940.
