= Nyctimeniini =

Scientific classification
- Domain: Eukaryota
- Kingdom: Animalia
- Phylum: Arthropoda
- Class: Insecta
- Order: Coleoptera
- Suborder: Polyphaga
- Infraorder: Cucujiformia
- Family: Cerambycidae
- Subfamily: Lamiinae
- Tribe: Nyctimeniini; Gressitt, 1951

Tribe of beetles

Nyctimeniini is a tribe of longhorn beetles of the subfamily Lamiinae. It was described by Gressitt in 1951. It contains the single genus Nyctimenius.

== Taxonomy ==
- Nyctimenius chiangi Huang, Liu & Chen, 2014
- Nyctimenius mamutensis (Hayashi, 1975)
- Nyctimenius ochraceovittatus (Aurivillius, 1922)
- Nyctimenius palawanicus (Aurivillius, 1922)
- Nyctimenius sabahensis (Hayashi, 1975)
- Nyctimenius subsericeus (Pascoe, 1866)
- Nyctimenius tristis (Fabricius, 1792)
- Nyctimenius varicornis (Fabricius, 1801)
