= Proctocera lugubris =

Scientific classification
- Domain: Eukaryota
- Kingdom: Animalia
- Phylum: Arthropoda
- Class: Insecta
- Order: Coleoptera
- Suborder: Polyphaga
- Infraorder: Cucujiformia
- Family: Cerambycidae
- Genus: Proctocera
- Species: P. lugubris

Binomial name
- Proctocera lugubris Thomson, 1858

Species of beetle

Proctocera lugubris is a species of beetle in the family Cerambycidae. It was described by James Thomson in 1858. It is known from Gabon and the Democratic Republic of the Congo.
