= Nyctimenius varicornis =

Scientific classification
- Kingdom: Animalia
- Phylum: Arthropoda
- Clade: Pancrustacea
- Class: Insecta
- Order: Coleoptera
- Suborder: Polyphaga
- Infraorder: Cucujiformia
- Family: Cerambycidae
- Genus: Nyctimenius
- Species: N. varicornis

Binomial name
- Nyctimenius varicornis (Fabricius, 1801)

Synonyms
- Nyctimene agriloides J. Thomson, 1857; Nyctimene varicornis (Fabricius, 1801); Saperda varicornis Fabricius, 1801

Species of beetle

Nyctimenius varicornis is a species of beetle in the family Cerambycidae. It was described by Johan Christian Fabricius in 1801. It is known from Java, Cambodia, Singapore, Borneo, Sumatra, Malaysia, and Taiwan.
