= Microcymatura holonigra =

Scientific classification
- Kingdom: Animalia
- Phylum: Arthropoda
- Class: Insecta
- Order: Coleoptera
- Suborder: Polyphaga
- Infraorder: Cucujiformia
- Family: Cerambycidae
- Genus: Microcymatura
- Species: M. holonigra

Binomial name
- Microcymatura holonigra Breuning, 1954

Species of beetle

Microcymatura holonigra is a species of beetle in the family Cerambycidae. It was described by Stephan von Breuning in 1954.
