= Xenolea tomentosa =

Scientific classification
- Domain: Eukaryota
- Kingdom: Animalia
- Phylum: Arthropoda
- Class: Insecta
- Order: Coleoptera
- Suborder: Polyphaga
- Infraorder: Cucujiformia
- Family: Cerambycidae
- Genus: Xenolea
- Species: X. tomentosa

Binomial name
- Xenolea tomentosa (Pascoe, 1864)

Synonyms
- Aeschopalaea tomentosa Pascoe, 1864

Species of beetle

Xenolea tomentosa is a species of beetle in the family Cerambycidae. It was described by Francis Polkinghorne Pascoe in 1864. It is known from Singapore, Malaysia, Andaman Islands, and Sumatra.
