= Proctocera scalaris =

Scientific classification
- Domain: Eukaryota
- Kingdom: Animalia
- Phylum: Arthropoda
- Class: Insecta
- Order: Coleoptera
- Suborder: Polyphaga
- Infraorder: Cucujiformia
- Family: Cerambycidae
- Genus: Proctocera
- Species: P. scalaris

Binomial name
- Proctocera scalaris Chevrolat, 1855

Species of beetle

Proctocera scalaris is a species of beetle in the family Cerambycidae. It was described by Louis Alexandre Auguste Chevrolat in 1855. It is known from Sierra Leone, the Democratic Republic of the Congo, Cameroon, Nigeria, and the Republic of the Congo.
