= Acridocephala seriata =

Scientific classification
- Kingdom: Animalia
- Phylum: Arthropoda
- Clade: Pancrustacea
- Class: Insecta
- Order: Coleoptera
- Suborder: Polyphaga
- Infraorder: Cucujiformia
- Family: Cerambycidae
- Genus: Acridocephala
- Species: A. seriata

Binomial name
- Acridocephala seriata Jordan, 1903

Species of beetle

Acridocephala seriata is a species of beetle in the family Cerambycidae. It was described by Karl Jordan in 1903. It is known from Cameroon, the Republic of the Congo, the Democratic Republic of the Congo, and Gabon.
