= Crinotarsus sulcatus =

Scientific classification
- Kingdom: Animalia
- Phylum: Arthropoda
- Class: Insecta
- Order: Coleoptera
- Suborder: Polyphaga
- Infraorder: Cucujiformia
- Family: Cerambycidae
- Genus: Crinotarsus
- Species: C. sulcatus

Binomial name
- Crinotarsus sulcatus Breuning, 1947

Species of beetle

Crinotarsus sulcatus is a species of beetle in the family Cerambycidae. It was described by Breuning in 1947.
