= Elytracanthina =

Scientific classification
- Kingdom: Animalia
- Phylum: Arthropoda
- Class: Insecta
- Order: Coleoptera
- Suborder: Polyphaga
- Infraorder: Cucujiformia
- Family: Cerambycidae
- Subfamily: Lamiinae
- Tribe: Elytracanthinini; Bousquet, 2009
- Genus: Elytracanthina; Monné, 2005

Tribe of beetles

Elytracanthinini is a tribe of longhorn beetles of the subfamily Lamiinae. It contains the single genus Elytracanthina.

== Taxonomy ==
- Elytracanthina propinqua (Lane, 1959)
- Elytracanthina pugionata (Lane, 1955)
