= Emphytoecia camousseighti =

Scientific classification
- Kingdom: Animalia
- Phylum: Arthropoda
- Class: Insecta
- Order: Coleoptera
- Suborder: Polyphaga
- Infraorder: Cucujiformia
- Family: Cerambycidae
- Genus: Emphytoecia
- Species: E. camousseighti

Binomial name
- Emphytoecia camousseighti Cerda, 1995

Species of beetle

Emphytoecia camousseighti is a species of beetle in the family Cerambycidae. It was described by Cerda in 1995. It is known from Chile.
