= Xenolea collaris =

Scientific classification
- Domain: Eukaryota
- Kingdom: Animalia
- Phylum: Arthropoda
- Class: Insecta
- Order: Coleoptera
- Suborder: Polyphaga
- Infraorder: Cucujiformia
- Family: Cerambycidae
- Genus: Xenolea
- Species: X. collaris

Binomial name
- Xenolea collaris J. Thomson, 1864

Synonyms
- Aeschopalaea grisella Pascoe, 1864; Aeschopalaea agraria Pascoe, 1864; Aeschopalaea laticollis Pascoe, 1864

Species of longhorn beetle

Xenolea collaris is a species of beetle in the family Cerambycidae, and the type species of its genus. It was described by James Thomson in 1864. It is known from Indonesia, Taiwan and the Philippines.

== Subspecies ==
- Xenolea collaris formosana Breuning, 1965
- Xenolea collaris collaris J. Thomson, 1864
