= Acridocephala =

Scientific classification
- Domain: Eukaryota
- Kingdom: Animalia
- Phylum: Arthropoda
- Class: Insecta
- Order: Coleoptera
- Suborder: Polyphaga
- Infraorder: Cucujiformia
- Family: Cerambycidae
- Subfamily: Lamiinae
- Tribe: Acridocephalini; Dillon & Dillon, 1959
- Genus: Acridocephala; Chevrolat, 1855

Genus of beetles

Acridocephala is a genus of longhorn beetles of the subfamily Lamiinae, and the sole member of the tribe Acridocephalini, which was described by Dillon and Dillon in 1959. The genus is greatly divergent of the other Lamiini tribes of Ethiopia. The back of members heads and thoraxes and the elytra (or cases of the wings), unlike these other tribes, lie in a single plane. The front of these beetles are very narrowed forms a sharp angle with the vertex. Antenna tubercles are erect and do not diverge.

== Species ==
This genus includes the following species:

- Acridocephala alboannulata Breuning, 1936
- Acridocephala bifasciata Dillon & Dillon, 1959
- Acridocephala bistriata Chevrolat, 1855
- Acridocephala densepunctata Breuning, 1938
- Acridocephala nicoletii Thomson, 1858
- Acridocephala nubilosa Breuning, 1938
- Acridocephala pulchra Dillon & Dillon, 1959
- Acridocephala seriata Jordan, 1903
- Acridocephala variegata Aurivillius, 1886
