= Phyxium =

Scientific classification
- Domain: Eukaryota
- Kingdom: Animalia
- Phylum: Arthropoda
- Class: Insecta
- Order: Coleoptera
- Suborder: Polyphaga
- Infraorder: Cucujiformia
- Family: Cerambycidae
- Subfamily: Lamiinae
- Genus: Phyxium

Genus of beetles

Phyxium is a genus of longhorn beetles of the subfamily Lamiinae, containing the following species:

- Phyxium bufonium Pascoe, 1864
- Phyxium ignarum Pascoe, 1864
- Phyxium lanatum Fauvel, 1906
- Phyxium loriai Breuning, 1943
- Phyxium papuanum Breuning, 1943
- Phyxium scorpioides Pascoe, 1864
