= Megabasis =

Scientific classification
- Domain: Eukaryota
- Kingdom: Animalia
- Phylum: Arthropoda
- Class: Insecta
- Order: Coleoptera
- Suborder: Polyphaga
- Infraorder: Cucujiformia
- Family: Cerambycidae
- Subfamily: Lamiinae
- Tribe: Megabasini; Thomson, 1860
- Genus: Megabasis; Audinet-Serville, 1835
- Species: M. speculifera

Binomial name
- Megabasis speculifera (Kirby, 1818)

Tribe of beetles

Megabasis speculifera is a species of longhorn beetles, the sole member of the genus, Megabasis and the tribe Megabasini of the subfamily Lamiinae.
