= Microcymatura =

Scientific classification
- Kingdom: Animalia
- Phylum: Arthropoda
- Class: Insecta
- Order: Coleoptera
- Suborder: Polyphaga
- Infraorder: Cucujiformia
- Family: Cerambycidae
- Subfamily: Lamiinae
- Tribe: Microcymaturini; Breuning & Téocchi, 1985
- Genus: Microcymatura; Breuning, 1950

Genus of beetles

Microcymaturini is a tribe of longhorn beetles of the subfamily Lamiinae. It was described by Stephan von Breuning and Téocchi in 1985. It consists of a single genus, Microcymatura, and the following species:

- Microcymatura antennalis Breuning, 1950
- Microcymatura discalis Breuning, 1968
- Microcymatura flavipennis Báguena & Breuning, 1958
- Microcymatura flavodiscalis Báguena & Breuning, 1958
- Microcymatura holonigra Breuning, 1954
- Microcymatura macrophthalma Báguena & Breuning, 1958
