= Hirtaeschopalaea nubila =

Scientific classification
- Domain: Eukaryota
- Kingdom: Animalia
- Phylum: Arthropoda
- Class: Insecta
- Order: Coleoptera
- Suborder: Polyphaga
- Infraorder: Cucujiformia
- Family: Cerambycidae
- Genus: Hirtaeschopalaea
- Species: H. nubila

Binomial name
- Hirtaeschopalaea nubila (Matsushita, 1933)

Synonyms
- Jezohammus nubilus Matsushita, 1933; Xenolea nubila (Matsushita) Gressitt

Species of beetle

Hirtaeschopalaea nubila is a species of beetle in the family Cerambycidae. It was described by Masaki Matsushita in 1933, originally under the genus Jezohammus.
