= Nyctimenius chiangi =

Scientific classification
- Missing taxonomy template (fix): Nyctimenius
- Species: Template:Taxonomy/NyctimeniusN. chiangi

Binomial name
- Template:Taxonomy/NyctimeniusNyctimenius chiangi Huang, Liu & Chen, 2014

Species of beetle

Nyctimenius chiangi is a species of beetle in the family Cerambycidae. It was described by Huang, Liu and Chen in 2014. It is known from China.
