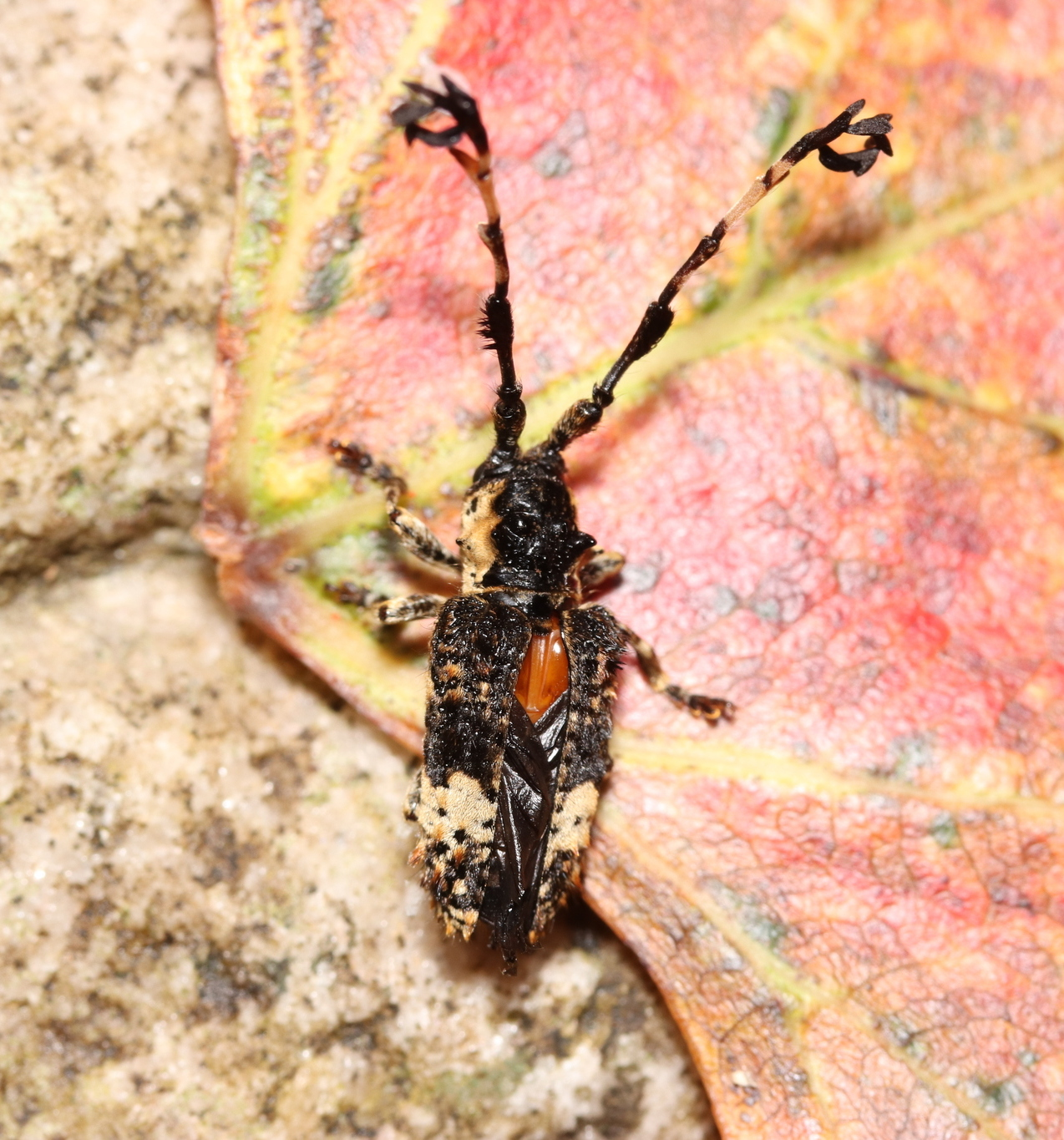
- Cloniocerus kraussii

Scientific classification
- Kingdom: Animalia
- Phylum: Arthropoda
- Class: Insecta
- Order: Coleoptera
- Suborder: Polyphaga
- Infraorder: Cucujiformia
- Family: Cerambycidae
- Subfamily: Lamiinae
- Tribe: Cloniocerini; Lacordaire, 1872
- Genus: Cloniocerus; Dejean, 1835

= Cloniocerus =

Tribe of beetles

Cloniocerini is a tribe of longhorn beetles of the subfamily Lamiinae. It was described by Lacordaire in 1872. It contains the single genus Cloniocerus, and the following species:

- Cloniocerus albosticticus Breuning, 1940
- Cloniocerus bohemanni White, 1855
- Cloniocerus constrictus Fahraeus, 1872
- Cloniocerus hystrix (Fabricius, 1781)
- Cloniocerus kraussii White, 1855
- Cloniocerus lamellicornis Breuning, 1950
- Cloniocerus ochripennis Breuning, 1940
