= Itheum robustum =

Scientific classification
- Domain: Eukaryota
- Kingdom: Animalia
- Phylum: Arthropoda
- Class: Insecta
- Order: Coleoptera
- Suborder: Polyphaga
- Infraorder: Cucujiformia
- Family: Cerambycidae
- Tribe: Pteropliini
- Genus: Itheum
- Species: I. robustum

Binomial name
- Itheum robustum Oke, 1932

Synonyms
- Zorilispe robustum (Oke, 1932) (misspelling)

Species of beetle

Itheum robustum is a species of beetle in the family Cerambycidae. It was described by Oke in 1932. It is known from Australia.
