= Cloniocerus hystrix =

Scientific classification
- Kingdom: Animalia
- Phylum: Arthropoda
- Class: Insecta
- Order: Coleoptera
- Suborder: Polyphaga
- Infraorder: Cucujiformia
- Family: Cerambycidae
- Genus: Cloniocerus
- Species: C. hystrix

Binomial name
- Cloniocerus hystrix (Fabricius, 1781)

Synonyms
- Lamia hystrix Fabricius, 1781

Species of beetle

Cloniocerus hystrix is a species of beetle in the family Cerambycidae. It was described by Johan Christian Fabricius in 1781.
