= Acridocephala densepunctata =

Scientific classification
- Kingdom: Animalia
- Phylum: Arthropoda
- Clade: Pancrustacea
- Class: Insecta
- Order: Coleoptera
- Suborder: Polyphaga
- Infraorder: Cucujiformia
- Family: Cerambycidae
- Genus: Acridocephala
- Species: A. densepunctata

Binomial name
- Acridocephala densepunctata Breuning, 1938

Species of beetle

Acridocephala densepunctata is a species of beetle in the family Cerambycidae. It was described by Stephan von Breuning in 1938. It is known from the Democratic Republic of the Congo.
