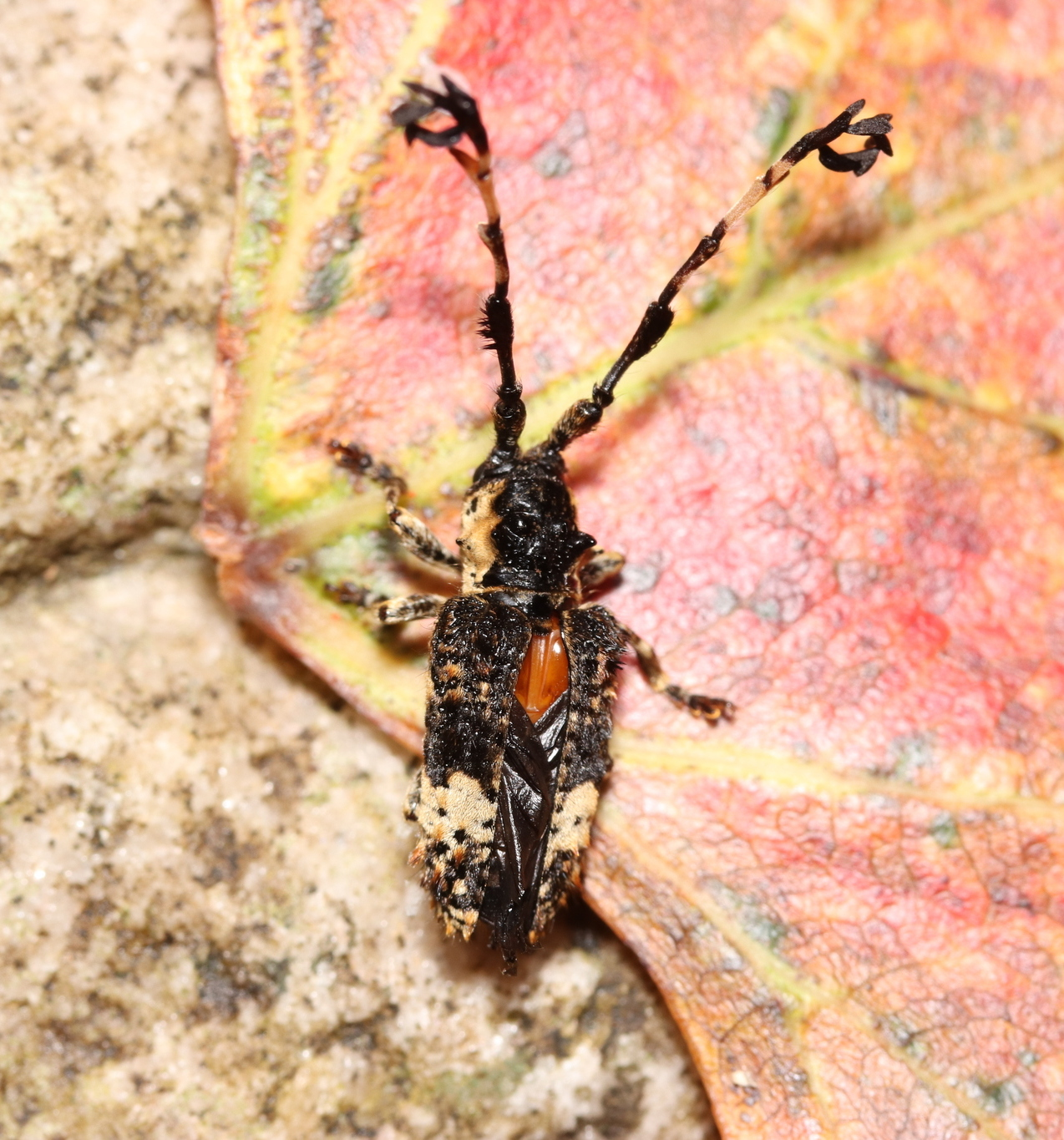
- Cloniocerus kraussii

Scientific classification
- Domain: Eukaryota
- Kingdom: Animalia
- Phylum: Arthropoda
- Class: Insecta
- Order: Coleoptera
- Suborder: Polyphaga
- Infraorder: Cucujiformia
- Family: Cerambycidae
- Genus: Cloniocerus
- Species: C. kraussii

Binomial name
- Cloniocerus kraussii White, 1855

Synonyms
- Thercladodes kraussii (White) Distant, 1904

= Cloniocerus kraussii =

Species of beetle

Cloniocerus kraussii is a species of beetle in the family Cerambycidae. It was described by White in 1855. It is known from Mozambique, Angola, Madagascar, Zambia, and South Africa.
