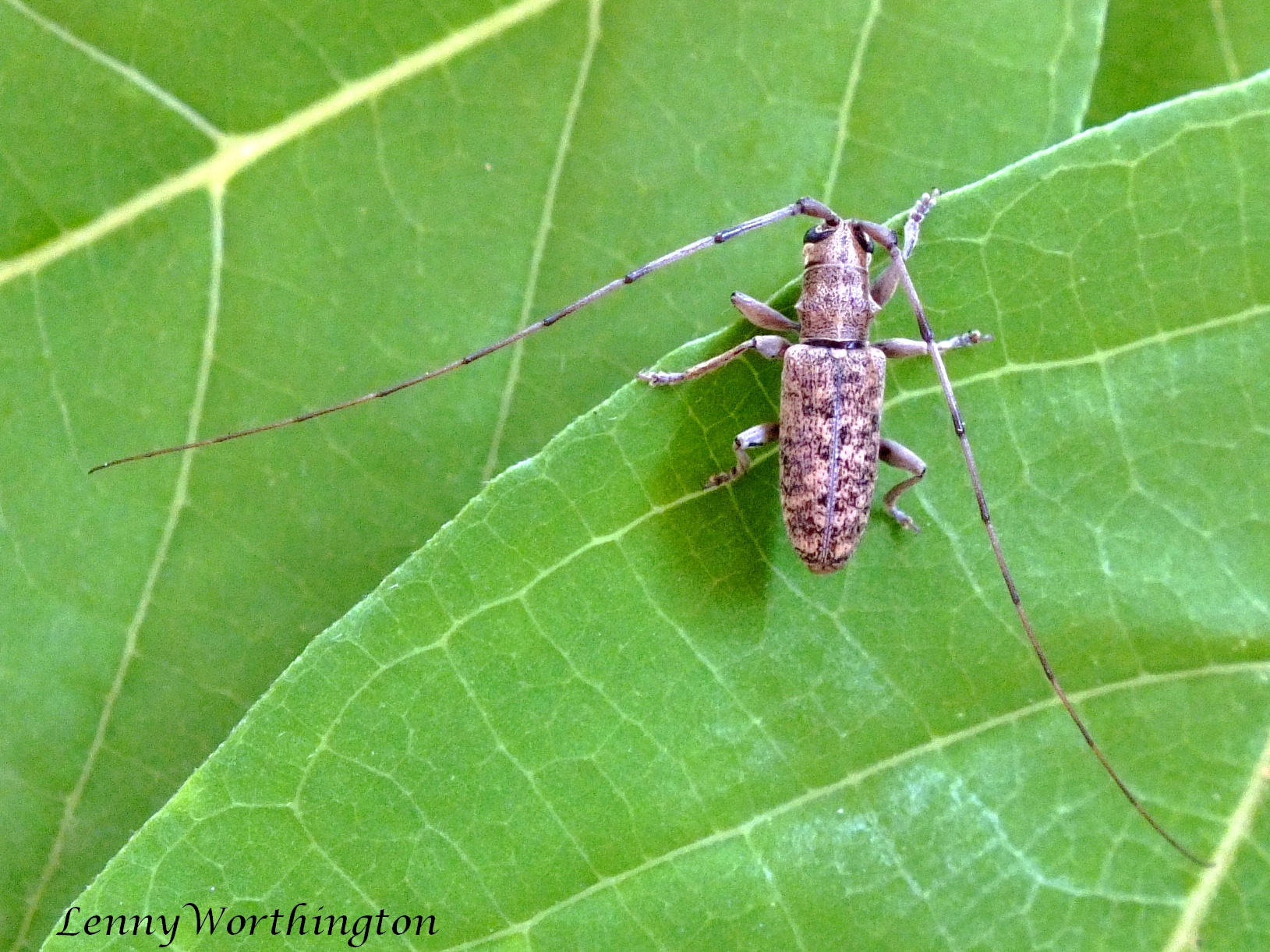

Scientific classification
- Kingdom: Animalia
- Phylum: Arthropoda
- Class: Insecta
- Order: Coleoptera
- Suborder: Polyphaga
- Infraorder: Cucujiformia
- Family: Cerambycidae
- Genus: Xenolea
- Species: X. asiatica

Binomial name
- Xenolea asiatica (Pic, 1925)

Synonyms
- Xenolea tomentosa asiatica (Pic, 1925); Aeschopalea asiatica Pic, 1925

= Xenolea asiatica =

Species of beetle

Xenolea asiatica is a species of beetle in the family Cerambycidae. It was described by Maurice Pic in 1925, originally under the genus Aeschopalea. It is known from Laos, India, Thailand, Japan, China, and Vietnam.
