= Acridocephala pulchra =

Scientific classification
- Kingdom: Animalia
- Phylum: Arthropoda
- Clade: Pancrustacea
- Class: Insecta
- Order: Coleoptera
- Suborder: Polyphaga
- Infraorder: Cucujiformia
- Family: Cerambycidae
- Genus: Acridocephala
- Species: A. pulchra

Binomial name
- Acridocephala pulchra Dillon & Dillon, 1959

Species of beetle

Acridocephala pulchra is a species of beetle in the family Cerambycidae. It was described by Dillon and Dillon in 1959. It is known from Gabon.
