= Velora alboplagiata =

Scientific classification
- Domain: Eukaryota
- Kingdom: Animalia
- Phylum: Arthropoda
- Class: Insecta
- Order: Coleoptera
- Suborder: Polyphaga
- Infraorder: Cucujiformia
- Family: Cerambycidae
- Genus: Velora
- Species: V. alboplagiata

Binomial name
- Velora alboplagiata (Aurivillius, 1927)

Species of beetle

Velora alboplagiata is a species of beetle in the family Cerambycidae. It was described by Per Olof Christopher Aurivillius in 1927 and is known from Australia.
