= Crinotarsus plagiatus =

Scientific classification
- Kingdom: Animalia
- Phylum: Arthropoda
- Class: Insecta
- Order: Coleoptera
- Suborder: Polyphaga
- Infraorder: Cucujiformia
- Family: Cerambycidae
- Genus: Crinotarsus
- Species: C. plagiatus

Binomial name
- Crinotarsus plagiatus Blanchard, 1853

Species of beetle

Crinotarsus plagiatus is a species of beetle in the family Cerambycidae. It was described by Blanchard in 1853.
