= Emphytoecia =

Scientific classification
- Kingdom: Animalia
- Phylum: Arthropoda
- Class: Insecta
- Order: Coleoptera
- Suborder: Polyphaga
- Infraorder: Cucujiformia
- Family: Cerambycidae
- Tribe: Pteropliini
- Genus: Emphytoecia; Fairmaire & Germain, 1859

Type species
- Agapanthia suturella Blanchard, 1851

Genus of beetles

Emphytoecia is a genus of longhorn beetles of the subfamily Lamiinae, containing the following species:

- Emphytoecia alboliturata (Blanchard in Gay, 1851)
- Emphytoecia camousseighti Cerda, 1995
- Emphytoecia dimidiata (Blanchard in Gay, 1851)
- Emphytoecia elquiensis Cerda, 1995
- Emphytoecia lineolata (Blanchard in Gay, 1851)
- Emphytoecia niveopicta Fairmaie & Germain, 1864
- Emphytoecia sutura-alba Fairmaie & Germain, 1859
- Emphytoecia suturella (Blanchard in Gay, 1851)
