= Velora =

Scientific classification
- Domain: Eukaryota
- Kingdom: Animalia
- Phylum: Arthropoda
- Class: Insecta
- Order: Coleoptera
- Suborder: Polyphaga
- Infraorder: Cucujiformia
- Family: Cerambycidae
- Subfamily: Lamiinae
- Tribe: Desmiphorini
- Genus: Velora; Thomson, 1864

Genus of beetles

Velora is a genus of longhorn beetles of the subfamily Lamiinae.

== Species ==
Velora contains the following species:

- Velora alboplagiata Aurivillius, 1927
- Velora australis Thomson, 1864
- Velora ciliata Breuning, 1931
- Velora curvifascia Aurivillius, 1927
- Velora sordida Pascoe, 1863
