= Parapolyacanthia =

Scientific classification
- Kingdom: Animalia
- Phylum: Arthropoda
- Class: Insecta
- Order: Coleoptera
- Suborder: Polyphaga
- Infraorder: Cucujiformia
- Family: Cerambycidae
- Tribe: Acanthoderini
- Genus: Parapolyacanthia

Genus of beetles

Parapolyacanthia is a genus of longhorn beetles of the subfamily Lamiinae, containing the following species:

- Parapolyacanthia assimilis Breuning, 1955
- Parapolyacanthia trifolium (Fauvel, 1906)
