= Acridocephala bistriata =

Scientific classification
- Kingdom: Animalia
- Phylum: Arthropoda
- Class: Insecta
- Order: Coleoptera
- Suborder: Polyphaga
- Infraorder: Cucujiformia
- Family: Cerambycidae
- Genus: Acridocephala
- Species: A. bistriata

Binomial name
- Acridocephala bistriata Chevrolat, 1855

Species of beetle

Acridocephala bistriata is a species of beetle in the family Cerambycidae. It was described by Louis Alexandre Auguste Chevrolat in 1855. It is known from the Democratic Republic of the Congo, Cameroon, and Nigeria.
