= Lamia bidens =

"Lamia" bidens

Scientific classification
- Kingdom: Animalia
- Phylum: Arthropoda
- Clade: Pancrustacea
- Class: Insecta
- Order: Coleoptera
- Suborder: Polyphaga
- Infraorder: Cucujiformia
- Family: Cerambycidae
- Subfamily: Lamiinae
- Genus: incertae sedis
- Species: "L." bidens

Binomial name
- "Lamia" bidens Fabricius, 1775

Species of beetle

Lamia bidens is a nomen dubium species of beetle in the family Cerambycidae. It was described by Johan Christian Fabricius in 1775. It is described from Australia.
