= Hirtaeschopalaea fasciculata =

Scientific classification
- Kingdom: Animalia
- Phylum: Arthropoda
- Class: Insecta
- Order: Coleoptera
- Suborder: Polyphaga
- Infraorder: Cucujiformia
- Family: Cerambycidae
- Genus: Hirtaeschopalaea
- Species: H. fasciculata

Binomial name
- Hirtaeschopalaea fasciculata Breuning, 1938

Synonyms
- Hirteschopalaea fasciculata Breuning, 1938; Xenolea obliqua Gressitt, 1940

Species of beetle

Hirtaeschopalaea fasciculata is a species of beetle in the family Cerambycidae. It was described by Stephan von Breuning in 1938.
