= Parapolyacanthia assimilis =

Scientific classification
- Kingdom: Animalia
- Phylum: Arthropoda
- Class: Insecta
- Order: Coleoptera
- Suborder: Polyphaga
- Infraorder: Cucujiformia
- Family: Cerambycidae
- Genus: Parapolyacanthia
- Species: P. assimilis

Binomial name
- Parapolyacanthia assimilis Breuning, 1955

Species of beetle

Parapolyacanthia assimilis is a species of beetle in the family Cerambycidae. It was described by Matthew Antoine Nassef in 2022.
