= Acridocephala variegata =

Scientific classification
- Kingdom: Animalia
- Phylum: Arthropoda
- Clade: Pancrustacea
- Class: Insecta
- Order: Coleoptera
- Suborder: Polyphaga
- Infraorder: Cucujiformia
- Family: Cerambycidae
- Genus: Acridocephala
- Species: A. variegata

Binomial name
- Acridocephala variegata Aurivillius, 1886

Species of beetle

Acridocephala variegata is a species of beetle in the family Cerambycidae. It was described by Per Olof Christopher Aurivillius in 1886. It is known from Gabon and Cameroon.
