= Itheum =

Scientific classification
- Domain: Eukaryota
- Kingdom: Animalia
- Phylum: Arthropoda
- Class: Insecta
- Order: Coleoptera
- Suborder: Polyphaga
- Infraorder: Cucujiformia
- Family: Cerambycidae
- Subfamily: Lamiinae
- Tribe: Pteropliini
- Genus: Itheum; Pascoe, 1864

Type species
- Itheum vittigerum Pascoe, 1864.

Genus of beetles

Itheum is a genus of longhorn beetles of the subfamily Lamiinae, containing the following species:

- Itheum alboscutellare Breuning, 1940
- Itheum fuscoantennale Breuning, 1943
- Itheum lineare Pascoe, 1864
- Itheum robustum Oke, 1932
- Itheum villosum Oke, 1932
- Itheum vittigerum Pascoe, 1864
