= Elytracanthina propinqua =

Scientific classification
- Kingdom: Animalia
- Phylum: Arthropoda
- Class: Insecta
- Order: Coleoptera
- Suborder: Polyphaga
- Infraorder: Cucujiformia
- Family: Cerambycidae
- Genus: Elytracanthina
- Species: E. propinqua

Binomial name
- Elytracanthina propinqua (Lane, 1959)

Synonyms
- Elytracantha propinqua Lane, 1959

Species of beetle

Elytracanthina propinqua is a species of beetle in the family Cerambycidae. It was described by Lane in 1959. It is known from Brazil.
