= Sormida maculicollis =

Scientific classification
- Kingdom: Animalia
- Phylum: Arthropoda
- Class: Insecta
- Order: Coleoptera
- Suborder: Polyphaga
- Infraorder: Cucujiformia
- Family: Cerambycidae
- Genus: Sormida
- Species: S. maculicollis

Binomial name
- Sormida maculicollis Thomson, 1865

Species of beetle

Sormida maculicollis is a species of beetle in the family Cerambycidae. It was described by Thomson in 1865.
