= Eudryoctenes africanus =

Scientific classification
- Domain: Eukaryota
- Kingdom: Animalia
- Phylum: Arthropoda
- Class: Insecta
- Order: Coleoptera
- Suborder: Polyphaga
- Infraorder: Cucujiformia
- Family: Cerambycidae
- Genus: Eudryoctenes
- Species: E. africanus

Binomial name
- Eudryoctenes africanus (Jordan, 1903)

Synonyms
- Polyrrhaphis africanus Jordan, 1903

Species of beetle

Eudryoctenes africanus is a species of beetle in the family Cerambycidae. It was described by Karl Jordan in 1903.

== Subspecies ==
- Eudryoctenes africanus africanus (Jordan, 1903)
- Eudryoctenes africanus orientalis Breuning, 1958
- Eudryoctenes africanus togonicus (Hintz, 1919)
