= Nyctimenius palawanicus =

Scientific classification
- Kingdom: Animalia
- Phylum: Arthropoda
- Class: Insecta
- Order: Coleoptera
- Suborder: Polyphaga
- Infraorder: Cucujiformia
- Family: Cerambycidae
- Genus: Nyctimenius
- Species: N. palawanicus

Binomial name
- Nyctimenius palawanicus (Aurivillius, 1922)

Synonyms
- Nyctimenius ochraceovittatus palawanicus (Aurivillius, 1922); Nyctimenius ochraceovittata palawanica (Aurivillius, 1922) (misspelling)

Species of beetle

Nyctimenius palawanicus is a species of beetle in the family Cerambycidae. It was described by Per Olof Christopher Aurivillius in 1922. It is known from the Philippines.
