= Xenolea =

Scientific classification
- Kingdom: Animalia
- Phylum: Arthropoda
- Clade: Pancrustacea
- Class: Insecta
- Order: Coleoptera
- Suborder: Polyphaga
- Infraorder: Cucujiformia
- Family: Cerambycidae
- Subfamily: Lamiinae
- Genus: Xenolea

Genus of beetles

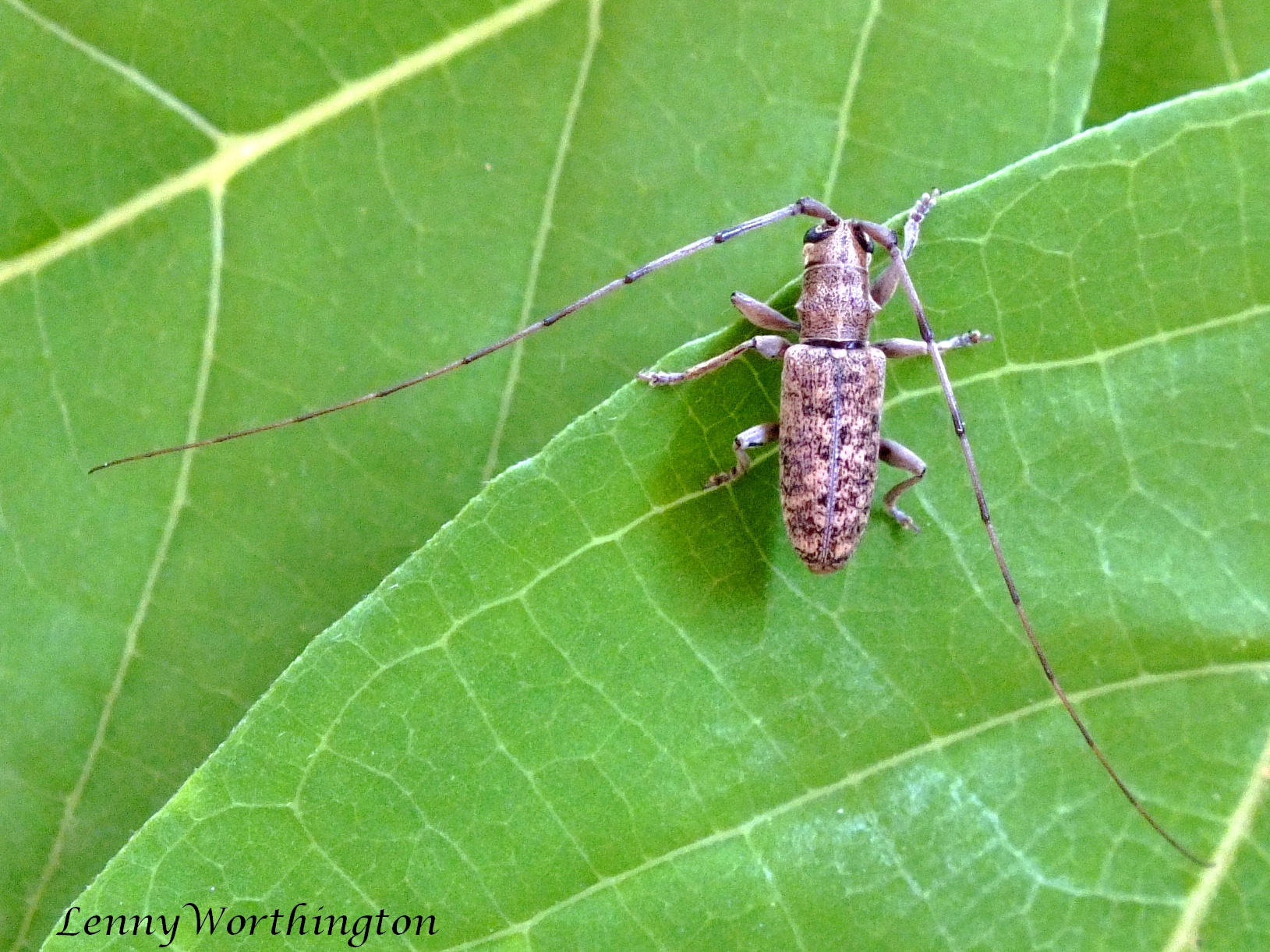
Xenolea asiatica

Xenolea is a genus of longhorn beetles of the subfamily Lamiinae, containing the following species:

- Xenolea asiatica (Pic, 1925)
- Xenolea collaris J. Thomson, 1864
- Xenolea tomentosa (Pascoe, 1864)
