= Dorcadionoides =

Scientific classification
- Kingdom: Animalia
- Phylum: Arthropoda
- Class: Insecta
- Order: Coleoptera
- Suborder: Polyphaga
- Infraorder: Cucujiformia
- Family: Cerambycidae
- Genus: Dorcadionoides
- Species: D. subaeneus

Binomial name
- Dorcadionoides subaeneus Motschulsky, 1857

Genus of beetles

Dorcadionoides subaeneus is a species of beetle in the family Cerambycidae, and the only species in the genus Dorcadionoides. It was described by Victor Motschulsky in 1857.
