= Hyborhabdus =

Scientific classification
- Domain: Eukaryota
- Kingdom: Animalia
- Phylum: Arthropoda
- Class: Insecta
- Order: Coleoptera
- Suborder: Polyphaga
- Infraorder: Cucujiformia
- Family: Cerambycidae
- Tribe: Hyborhabdini; Aurivillius, 1911
- Genus: Hyborhabdus; Aurivillius, 1911
- Species: H. singularis

Binomial name
- Hyborhabdus singularis Aurivillius, 1911

Genus of beetles

Hyborhabdini is a beetle tribe in the family Cerambycidae described by Per Olof Christopher Aurivillius in 1911. Its only genus, Hyborhabdus, and only species, Hyborhabdus singularis, were described by the same author in the same year.
