= Decellia =

Scientific classification
- Kingdom: Animalia
- Phylum: Arthropoda
- Class: Insecta
- Order: Coleoptera
- Suborder: Polyphaga
- Infraorder: Cucujiformia
- Family: Cerambycidae
- Genus: Decellia
- Species: D. bimaculipennis

Binomial name
- Decellia bimaculipennis Breuning, 1968

Genus of beetles

Decellia bimaculipennis is a species of beetle in the family Cerambycidae, and the only species in the genus Decellia. It was described by Stephan von Breuning in 1968.
