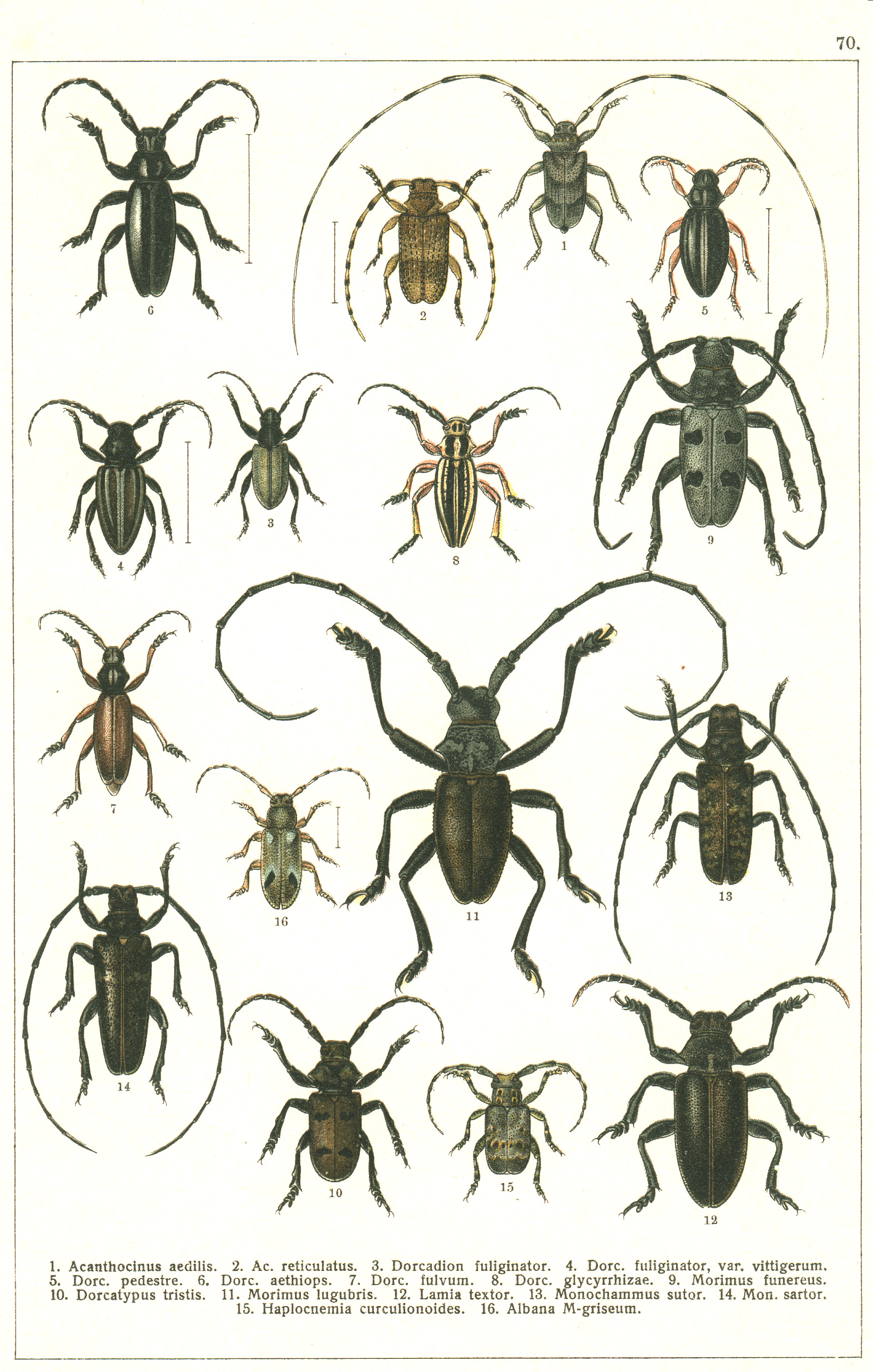
- A selection of Lamiinae from Georgiy Jacobson's Beetles of Russia and Western Europe, 1905–1915

Scientific classification
- Kingdom: Animalia
- Phylum: Arthropoda
- Class: Insecta
- Order: Coleoptera
- Suborder: Polyphaga
- Infraorder: Cucujiformia
- Family: Cerambycidae
- Subfamily: Lamiinae; Latreille, 1825

Tribes
- Many, see text

= Lamiinae =

Subfamily of beetles

Lamiinae, commonly called flat-faced longhorns, are a subfamily of the longhorn beetle family (Cerambycidae). The subfamily includes over 750 genera, rivaled in diversity within the family only by the subfamily Cerambycinae.

== Tribes ==
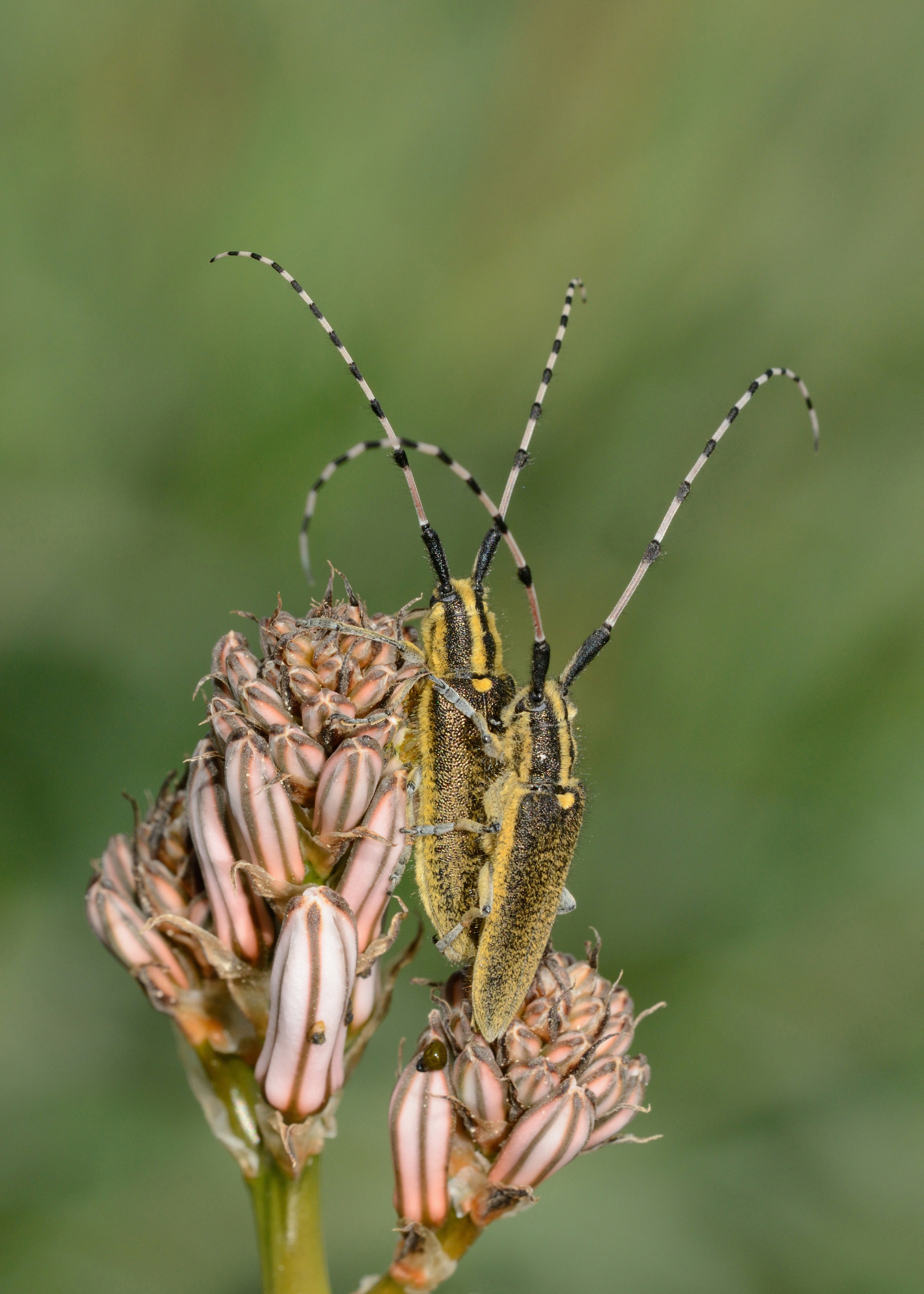
Agapanthia pustulifera

The tribal level classification of the Lamiinae is still yet to be completely resolved. Lacordaire in the 1870s split the Lamiinae into nearly 94 tribes while the work of Bouchard et al. (2011) classified them into 80 tribes. Some tribes have been established for single genera and several genera have not been placed reliably within any tribe. Some of the tribes included below may not be valid and several have been synonymised.

- Acanthocinini Blanchard, 1845
- Acanthoderini Thomson, 1860
- Acanthomerosternoplonini Tippmann, 1955
- Acmocerini Thomson, 1864
- Acridocephalini Dillon & Dillon, 1959
- Acrocinini Thomson, 1860
- Aderpasini Breuning & Téocchi, 1977
- Aerenicini Lacordaire, 1872
- Agapanthiini Mulsant, 1839
- Ancylonotini Lacordaire, 1869
- Anisocerini Thomson, 1860
- Apomecynini Thomson, 1860
- Astathini Thomson, 1864
- Batocerini Lacordaire, 1869
- Calliini Thomson, 1864
- Ceroplesini Thomson, 1860
- Cloniocerini Lacordaire, 1872
- Colobotheini Thomson, 1860
- Compsosomatini Thomson, 1857
- Crinotarsini Lacordaire, 1872
- Crossotini Thomson, 1864
- Cyrtinini Thomson, 1864
- Desmiphorini Thomson, 1860
- Dorcadiini Latreille, 1825
- Dorcaschematini Thomson, 1860
- Elytracanthinini Lane, 1955
- Emphytoeciini Lacordaire, 1872
- Enicodini Thomson, 1860
- Epicastini Thomson, 1864
- Eunidiini Téocchi et al., 2010
- Eupromerini Galileo & Martins, 1995
- Exocentrini Pascoe, 1864
- Forsteriini Tippmann, 1960
- Gnomini Thomson, 1864
- Gyaritini Breuning, 1956
- Heliolini Breuning, 1951
- Hemilophini Thomson, 1868
- Homonoeini Thomson, 1864
- Hyborhabdini Aurivillius, 1911
- Lamiini Latreille, 1825 (including Monochamini)
- Laticraniini Lane, 1959
- Mauesiini Lane, 1956
- Megabasini Thomson, 1864
- Mesosini Thomson, 1860
- Microcymaturini Breuning & Téocchi, 1985
- Moneilemini Thomson, 1864
- Morimonellini Lobanov, Danilevsky & Murzin, 1982
- Morimopsini Lacordaire, 1869
- Nyctimeniini Gressitt, 1951
- Oculariini Breuning, 1950
- Onciderini Thomson, 1860
- Onocephalini Sturm, 1843
- Pachystolini Aurivillius, 1922
- Parmenini Mulsant, 1839
- Petrognathini Blanchard, 1845
- Phacellini Lacordaire, 1872
- Phantasini Hunt & Breuning, 1957
- Phrissomini Thomson, 1860
- Phrynetini Thomson, 1864
- Pogonocherini Mulsant, 1839
- Polyrhaphidini Thomson, 1860
- Pretiliini Martins & Galileo, 1990
- Proctocerini Aurivillius, 1921
- Prosopocerini Thomson, 1868
- Protonarthrini Thomson, 1864
- Pseudomacrochenus Breuning, 1942
- Pteropliini Thomson, 1860
- Rhodopinini Gressitt, 1951
- Saperdini Mulsant, 1839 (including Phytoeciini)
- Stenobiini Breuning, 1950
- Sternotomini Thomson, 1860
- Tapeinini Thomson, 1857
- Tetraopini Thomson, 1860
- Tetraulaxini Breuning & Téocchi, 1976
- Tetropini Portevin, 1927
- Theocridini Thomson, 1858
- Tmesisternini Thomson, 1860
- Tragocephalini Thomson, 1857
- Velorini Thomson, 1864
- Xenofreini Bates, 1885
- Xenoleini Lacordaire, 1869
- Xylorhizini Lacordaire, 1872
- Zygocerini Lacordaire, 1872

Taxa incertae sedis:

- genus Cerambycinus Münster in Germar 1839
- genus Cypriola J. Thomson, 1865
- genus Decellia Breuning, 1968
- genus Dorcadionoides Motschulsky, 1857
- genus Falsozeargyra Gilmour & Breuning, 1963
- genus Heteropalpoides Fisher, 1935
- genus †Lamiophanes: monotypic species †Lamia schroeteri Giebel, 1856
- genus Paralamiodorcadion Breuning, 1967
- genus Parmenops Schaufuss, 1891
- genus Prosoplus Blanchard, 1853
- genus Pterolophiella Breuning, 1952
- species Lamia bidens Fabricius, 1775
