= Curiofrea =

Scientific classification
- Kingdom: Animalia
- Phylum: Arthropoda
- Class: Insecta
- Order: Coleoptera
- Suborder: Polyphaga
- Infraorder: Cucujiformia
- Family: Cerambycidae
- Genus: Curiofrea
- Species: C. curiosa

Binomial name
- Curiofrea curiosa Galileo & Martins, 1999

Genus of beetles

Curiofrea curiosa is a species of beetle in the family Cerambycidae, and the only species in the genus Curiofrea. It was described by Galileo and Martins in 1999.
