= Paralamiodorcadion =

Scientific classification
- Kingdom: Animalia
- Phylum: Arthropoda
- Class: Insecta
- Order: Coleoptera
- Suborder: Polyphaga
- Infraorder: Cucujiformia
- Family: Cerambycidae
- Genus: Paralamiodorcadion
- Species: P. schmidi

Binomial name
- Paralamiodorcadion schmidi Breuning, 1967

Genus of beetles

Paralamiodorcadion schmidi is a species of beetle in the family Cerambycidae, and the only species in the genus Paralamiodorcadion. It was described by Stephan von Breuning in 1967.
