= Oroxenofrea =

Scientific classification
- Kingdom: Animalia
- Phylum: Arthropoda
- Class: Insecta
- Order: Coleoptera
- Suborder: Polyphaga
- Infraorder: Cucujiformia
- Family: Cerambycidae
- Genus: Oroxenofrea
- Species: O. spiculata

Binomial name
- Oroxenofrea spiculata Galileo & Martins, 1999

Genus of beetles

Oroxenofrea spiculata is a species of beetle in the family Cerambycidae, and the only species in the genus Oroxenofrea. It was described by Galileo and Martins in 1999.
