= Eunidiella =

Scientific classification
- Kingdom: Animalia
- Phylum: Arthropoda
- Class: Insecta
- Order: Coleoptera
- Suborder: Polyphaga
- Infraorder: Cucujiformia
- Family: Cerambycidae
- Genus: Eunidiella; Breuning, 1940
- Species: E. pilosa

Binomial name
- Eunidiella pilosa Breuning, 1940

Genus of beetles

Eunidiella pilosa is a species of beetle in the family Cerambycidae, and the only species in the monotypic genus Eunidiella. It was described by Breuning in 1940.
