= Eunidiopsis =

Scientific classification
- Kingdom: Animalia
- Phylum: Arthropoda
- Class: Insecta
- Order: Coleoptera
- Suborder: Polyphaga
- Infraorder: Cucujiformia
- Family: Cerambycidae
- Genus: Eunidiopsis
- Species: E. bicolor

Binomial name
- Eunidiopsis bicolor Breuning, 1939

Species of beetle

Eunidiopsis bicolor is a species of beetle in the family Cerambycidae, and the only species in the genus Eunidiopsis. It was described by Breuning in 1939.
