= Paraxenolea =

Scientific classification
- Kingdom: Animalia
- Phylum: Arthropoda
- Class: Insecta
- Order: Coleoptera
- Suborder: Polyphaga
- Infraorder: Cucujiformia
- Family: Cerambycidae
- Genus: Paraxenolea
- Species: P. indica

Binomial name
- Paraxenolea indica (Breuning, 1940)

Genus of beetles

Paraxenolea indica is a species of beetle in the family Cerambycidae, and the only species in the genus Paraxenolea. It was described by Stephan von Breuning in 1940.
