= Lamiophanes =

Lamiophanes Temporal range: Early Cretaceous, 145.5–140.2 Ma

Scientific classification
- Domain: Eukaryota
- Kingdom: Animalia
- Phylum: Arthropoda
- Class: Insecta
- Order: Coleoptera
- Suborder: Polyphaga
- Infraorder: Cucujiformia
- Family: Cerambycidae
- Genus: †Lamiophanes
- Species: †L. schroeteri

Binomial name
- †Lamiophanes schroeteri Giebel, 1856

Synonyms
- Lamia schroeteri Giebel, 1856

Extinct genus of beetles

Lamiophanes is an extinct genus of beetle in the family Cerambycidae. It contains a single species, Lamiophanes schroeteri, described by Christoph Gottfried Andreas Giebel in 1856 based on material from the Lulworth Formation.
