= Amplitempora =

Scientific classification
- Kingdom: Animalia
- Phylum: Arthropoda
- Class: Insecta
- Order: Coleoptera
- Suborder: Polyphaga
- Infraorder: Cucujiformia
- Family: Cerambycidae
- Genus: Amplitempora
- Species: A. captiocula

Binomial name
- Amplitempora captiocula Giesbert, 1996

Genus of beetles

Amplitempora captiocula is a species of beetle in the family Cerambycidae, and the only species in the genus Amplitempora. It was described by Giesbert in 1996.
