= Parmenops =

Scientific classification
- Kingdom: Animalia
- Phylum: Arthropoda
- Class: Insecta
- Order: Coleoptera
- Suborder: Polyphaga
- Infraorder: Cucujiformia
- Family: Cerambycidae
- Genus: Parmenops
- Species: P. longicornis

Binomial name
- Parmenops longicornis Schaufuss, 1891

Genus of beetles

Parmenops longicornis is an extinct species of beetle in the family Cerambycidae, and the only species in the genus Parmenops. It was described by Schaufuss in 1891. It has been found in Baltic amber.
