= Heteropalpoides =

Scientific classification
- Kingdom: Animalia
- Phylum: Arthropoda
- Class: Insecta
- Order: Coleoptera
- Suborder: Polyphaga
- Infraorder: Cucujiformia
- Family: Cerambycidae
- Genus: Heteropalpoides
- Species: H. aberrans

Binomial name
- Heteropalpoides aberrans Fisher, 1935

Genus of beetles

Heteropalpoides aberrans is a species of beetle in the family Cerambycidae, and the only species in the genus Heteropalpoides. It was described by Fisher in 1935.
