= Cerambycinus =

Scientific classification
- Domain: Eukaryota
- Kingdom: Animalia
- Phylum: Arthropoda
- Class: Insecta
- Order: Coleoptera
- Suborder: Polyphaga
- Infraorder: Cucujiformia
- Family: Cerambycidae
- Genus: †Cerambycinus; Münster in Germar, 1839
- Species: †C. dubius

Binomial name
- †Cerambycinus dubius Münster in Germar, 1839

Extinct species of beetle

Cerambycinus is a genus of Jurassic beetle in the family Cerambycidae, and containing only one species Cerambycinus dubius. It is known from Solnhofen Limestone. It was described by Münster in 1839. Its body length was about 2 cm.
