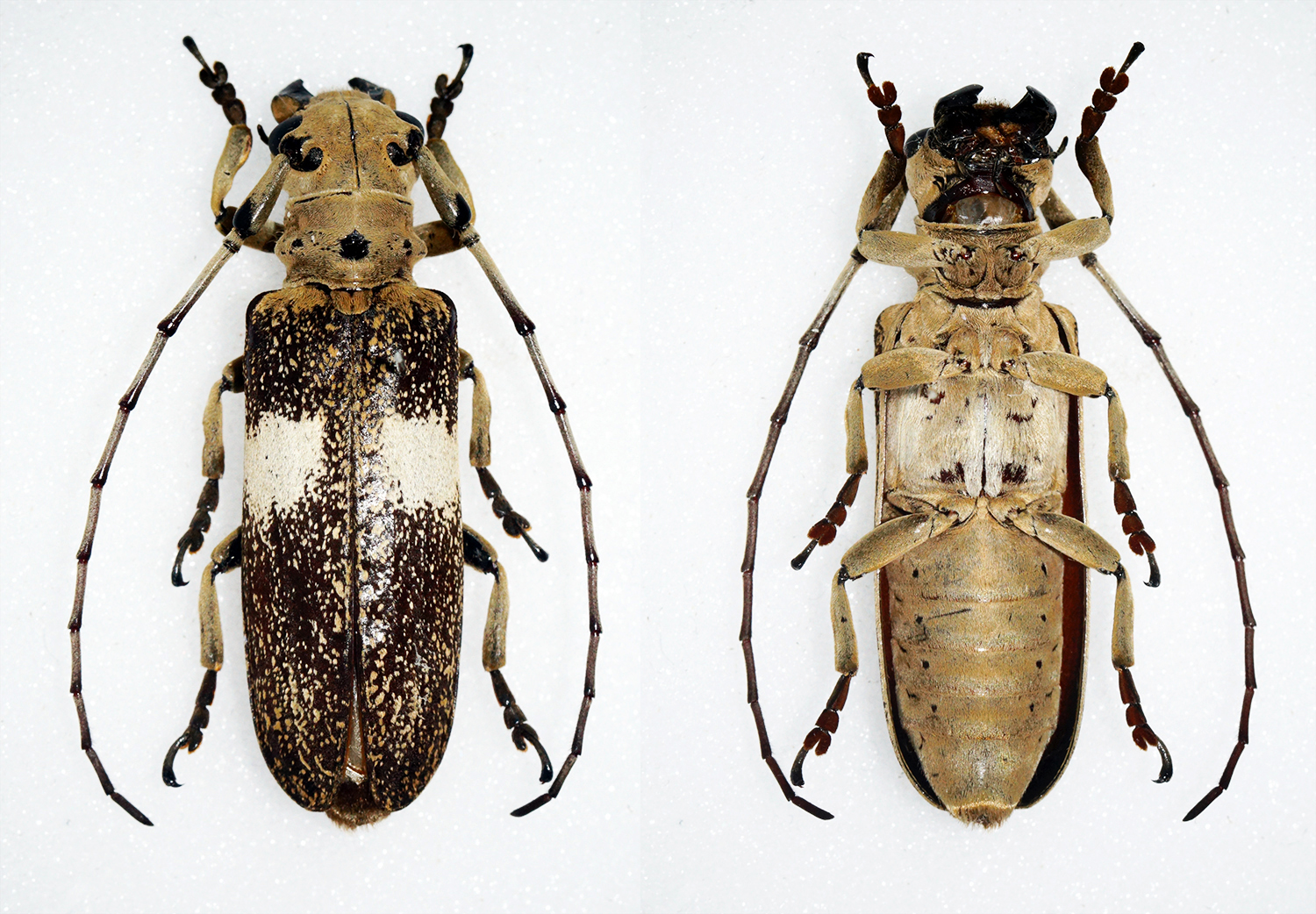

Scientific classification
- Kingdom: Animalia
- Phylum: Arthropoda
- Class: Insecta
- Order: Coleoptera
- Suborder: Polyphaga
- Infraorder: Cucujiformia
- Family: Cerambycidae
- Genus: Laticranium
- Species: L. mandibulare

Binomial name
- Laticranium mandibulare Lane, 1959

= Laticranium =

Genus of beetles

Laticranium mandibulare is a species of beetle in the family Cerambycidae, and the only species in the genus Laticranium. It was described by Lane in 1959.
