= Pterolophiella =

Scientific classification
- Kingdom: Animalia
- Phylum: Arthropoda
- Class: Insecta
- Order: Coleoptera
- Suborder: Polyphaga
- Infraorder: Cucujiformia
- Family: Cerambycidae
- Genus: Pterolophiella
- Species: P. olivicollis

Binomial name
- Pterolophiella olivicollis Breuning, 1952

Genus of beetles

Pterolophiella olivicollis is a species of beetle in the family Cerambycidae, and the only species in the genus Pterolophiella. It was described by Stephan von Breuning in 1952.
