= Cypriola =

Cypriola acanthocinoides

Scientific classification
- Domain: Eukaryota
- Kingdom: Animalia
- Phylum: Arthropoda
- Class: Insecta
- Order: Coleoptera
- Suborder: Polyphaga
- Infraorder: Cucujiformia
- Family: Cerambycidae
- Genus: Cypriola; Thomson, 1864
- Species: C. acanthocinoides

Binomial name
- Cypriola acanthocinoides Thomson, 1865

Genus of beetles

Cypriola is a genus of beetles in the family Cerambycidae. It is monotypic, being represented by the single species Cypriola acanthocinoides. It was described by Thomson in 1865.
