= Protonarthrini =

Scientific classification
- Kingdom: Animalia
- Phylum: Arthropoda
- Class: Insecta
- Order: Coleoptera
- Suborder: Polyphaga
- Infraorder: Cucujiformia
- Family: Cerambycidae
- Subfamily: Lamiinae
- Tribe: Protonarthrini; Thomson, 1864

Tribe of beetles

Protonarthrini is a tribe of longhorn beetles of the subfamily Lamiinae. It was described by Thomson in 1864.

== Taxonomy ==
- Brachynarthron Breuning, 1956
- Falsosophronica Breuning, 1952
- Protonarthron Thomson, 1858
- Karlwernerius Gaudin and Sudre, 2022
