= Brachynarthron aeneipennis =

Scientific classification
- Kingdom: Animalia
- Phylum: Arthropoda
- Class: Insecta
- Order: Coleoptera
- Suborder: Polyphaga
- Infraorder: Cucujiformia
- Family: Cerambycidae
- Genus: Brachynarthron
- Species: B. aeneipennis

Binomial name
- Brachynarthron aeneipennis Breuning, 1956

Synonyms
- Brachynarthron aeneipenne Breuning, 1962

Species of beetle

Brachynarthron aeneipennis is a species of beetle in the family Cerambycidae. It was described by Stephan von Breuning in 1956. It is known from Ghana.
