= Protonarthron fasciatum =

Scientific classification
- Kingdom: Animalia
- Phylum: Arthropoda
- Class: Insecta
- Order: Coleoptera
- Suborder: Polyphaga
- Infraorder: Cucujiformia
- Family: Cerambycidae
- Genus: Protonarthron
- Species: P. fasciatum

Binomial name
- Protonarthron fasciatum Breuning, 1936

Species of beetle

Protonarthron fasciatum is a species of beetle in the family Cerambycidae. It was described by Stephan von Breuning in 1936.
