= Brachynarthron simile =

Scientific classification
- Kingdom: Animalia
- Phylum: Arthropoda
- Class: Insecta
- Order: Coleoptera
- Suborder: Polyphaga
- Infraorder: Cucujiformia
- Family: Cerambycidae
- Genus: Brachynarthron
- Species: B. simile

Binomial name
- Brachynarthron simile Breuning, 1964

Species of beetle

Brachynarthron simile is a species of beetle in the family Cerambycidae. It was described by Stephan von Breuning in 1964. It is known from Uganda.
