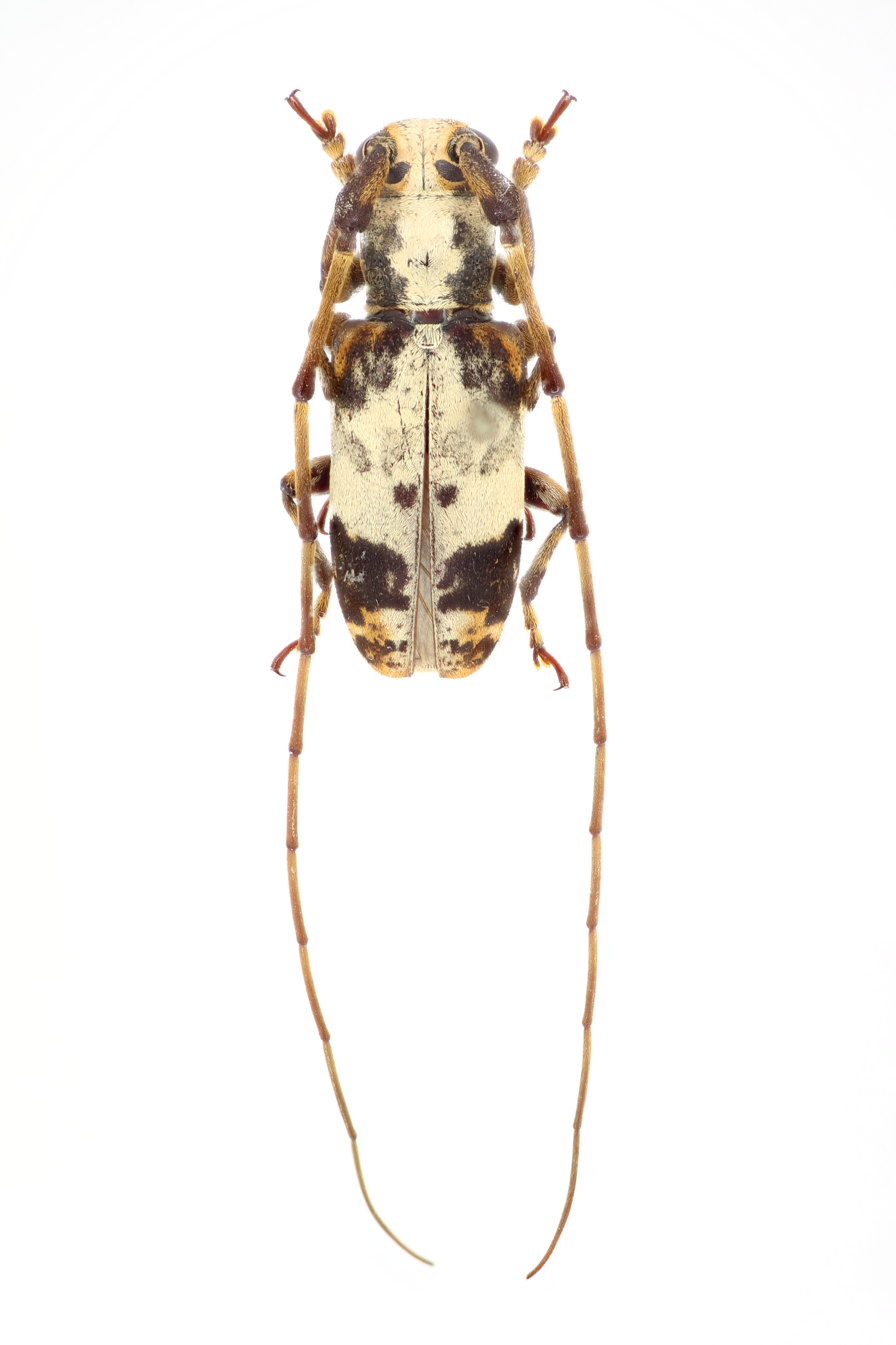

Scientific classification
- Kingdom: Animalia
- Phylum: Arthropoda
- Clade: Pancrustacea
- Class: Insecta
- Order: Coleoptera
- Suborder: Polyphaga
- Infraorder: Cucujiformia
- Family: Cerambycidae
- Genus: Protonarthron
- Species: P. olympianum

Binomial name
- Protonarthron olympianum Aurivillius, 1913

= Protonarthron olympianum =

Species of beetle

Protonarthron olympianum is a species of beetle in the family Cerambycidae. It was described by Per Olof Christopher Aurivillius in 1913.
