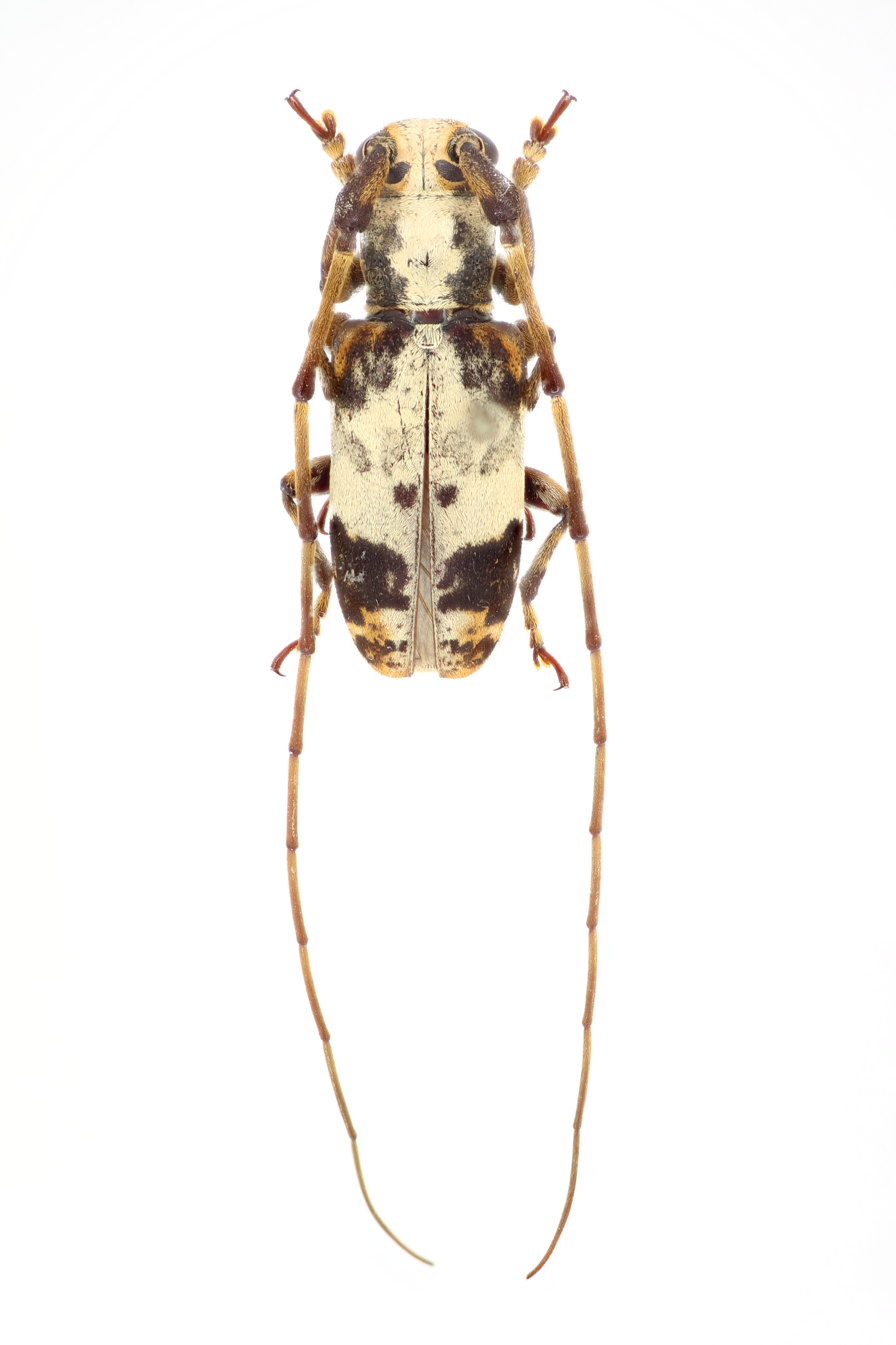
- Protonarthron olympianum

Scientific classification
- Kingdom: Animalia
- Phylum: Arthropoda
- Class: Insecta
- Order: Coleoptera
- Suborder: Polyphaga
- Infraorder: Cucujiformia
- Family: Cerambycidae
- Subfamily: Lamiinae
- Tribe: Protonarthrini
- Genus: Protonarthron; Thomson, 1858

= Protonarthron =

Genus of beetles

Protonarthron is a genus of longhorn beetles of the subfamily Lamiinae, containing the following species:

- Protonarthron diabolicum Thomson, 1858
- Protonarthron dubium Hintz, 1911
- Protonarthron fasciatum Breuning, 1936
- Protonarthron gracile Breuning, 1936
- Protonarthron indistinctum Breuning, 1938
- Protonarthron microps Jordan, 1903
- Protonarthron olympianum Aurivillius, 1913
- Protonarthron subfasciatum Jordan, 1894
