= Protonarthron dubium =

Scientific classification
- Kingdom: Animalia
- Phylum: Arthropoda
- Class: Insecta
- Order: Coleoptera
- Suborder: Polyphaga
- Infraorder: Cucujiformia
- Family: Cerambycidae
- Genus: Protonarthron
- Species: P. dubium

Binomial name
- Protonarthron dubium Hintz, 1911

Species of beetle

Protonarthron dubium is a species of beetle in the family Cerambycidae. It was described by Hintz in 1911.
