= Protonarthron diabolicum =

Scientific classification
- Kingdom: Animalia
- Phylum: Arthropoda
- Class: Insecta
- Order: Coleoptera
- Suborder: Polyphaga
- Infraorder: Cucujiformia
- Family: Cerambycidae
- Genus: Protonarthron
- Species: P. diabolicum

Binomial name
- Protonarthron diabolicum Thomson, 1858

Synonyms
- Protonarthron diabolicum m. chlora Breuning & Téocchi, 1982

Species of beetle

Protonarthron diabolicum is a species of beetle in the family Cerambycidae. It was described by James Thomson in 1858.
