= Protonarthron subfasciatum =

Scientific classification
- Kingdom: Animalia
- Phylum: Arthropoda
- Class: Insecta
- Order: Coleoptera
- Suborder: Polyphaga
- Infraorder: Cucujiformia
- Family: Cerambycidae
- Genus: Protonarthron
- Species: P. subfasciatum

Binomial name
- Protonarthron subfasciatum Jordan, 1894

Species of beetle

Protonarthron subfasciatum is a species of beetle in the family Cerambycidae. It was described by Karl Jordan in 1894.
