= Protonarthron indistinctum =

Scientific classification
- Kingdom: Animalia
- Phylum: Arthropoda
- Class: Insecta
- Order: Coleoptera
- Suborder: Polyphaga
- Infraorder: Cucujiformia
- Family: Cerambycidae
- Genus: Protonarthron
- Species: P. indistinctum

Binomial name
- Protonarthron indistinctum Breuning, 1938

Synonyms
- Protonarthron indistinctum Breuning & De Jong, 1941 nec Breuning, 1938

Species of beetle

Protonarthron indistinctum is a species of beetle in the family Cerambycidae. It was described by Stephan von Breuning in 1938. It is known from the Democratic Republic of the Congo.
