= Karlwernerius =

Scientific classification
- Kingdom: Animalia
- Phylum: Arthropoda
- Class: Insecta
- Order: Coleoptera
- Suborder: Polyphaga
- Infraorder: Cucujiformia
- Family: Cerambycidae
- Genus: Karlwernerius
- Species: K. caroli

Binomial name
- Karlwernerius caroli (Teocchi & al., 2010)

Genus of beetles

Karlwernerius caroli is a species of beetle in the family Cerambycidae, and the only species in the genus Karlwernerius. It was described by Teocchi & al. in 2010.
