= Falsosophronica =

Scientific classification
- Kingdom: Animalia
- Phylum: Arthropoda
- Class: Insecta
- Order: Coleoptera
- Suborder: Polyphaga
- Infraorder: Cucujiformia
- Family: Cerambycidae
- Genus: Falsosophronica
- Species: F. fuscobrunnea

Binomial name
- Falsosophronica fuscobrunnea Breuning, 1952

Genus of beetles

Falsosophronica fuscobrunnea is a species of beetle in the family Cerambycidae, and the only species in the genus Falsosophronica. It was described by Stephan von Breuning in 1952.
