= Brachynarthron =

Scientific classification
- Kingdom: Animalia
- Phylum: Arthropoda
- Class: Insecta
- Order: Coleoptera
- Suborder: Polyphaga
- Infraorder: Cucujiformia
- Family: Cerambycidae
- Genus: Brachynarthron; Breuning, 1956

Species
- Brachynarthron aeneipennis Breuning, 1956; Brachynarthron murzini Teocchi et al., 2010; Brachynarthron simile Breuning, 1964; Brachynarthron unicoloripennis Breuning, 1968

Genus of beetles

Brachynarthron is a genus of longhorn beetles of the subfamily Lamiinae.
