= Brachyolene nigrescens =

Scientific classification
- Kingdom: Animalia
- Phylum: Arthropoda
- Class: Insecta
- Order: Coleoptera
- Suborder: Polyphaga
- Infraorder: Cucujiformia
- Family: Cerambycidae
- Genus: Brachyolene
- Species: B. nigrescens

Binomial name
- Brachyolene nigrescens Breuning, 1977

Species of beetle

Brachyolene nigrescens is a species of beetle in the family Cerambycidae. It was described by Stephan von Breuning in 1977. It is known from Cameroon.
