= Brachyolene pictula =

Scientific classification
- Kingdom: Animalia
- Phylum: Arthropoda
- Class: Insecta
- Order: Coleoptera
- Suborder: Polyphaga
- Infraorder: Cucujiformia
- Family: Cerambycidae
- Genus: Brachyolene
- Species: B. pictula

Binomial name
- Brachyolene pictula Breuning, 1940

Species of beetle

Brachyolene pictula is a species of beetle in the family Cerambycidae. It was described by Stephan von Breuning in 1940. It is known from Uganda.
