= Tetraulax =

Scientific classification
- Kingdom: Animalia
- Phylum: Arthropoda
- Class: Insecta
- Order: Coleoptera
- Suborder: Polyphaga
- Infraorder: Cucujiformia
- Family: Cerambycidae
- Subfamily: Lamiinae
- Tribe: Tetraulaxini
- Genus: Tetraulax; Jordan, 1903

Species
- See text

Genus of beetles

Tetraulax is a genus of longhorn beetles of the subfamily Lamiinae.

== Species ==
- Tetraulax affinis Breuning, 1938
- Tetraulax albofasciata Breuning, 1935
- Tetraulax albolateralis Breuning, 1940
- Tetraulax albovittipennis Breuning, 1961
- Tetraulax gracilis Breuning, 1938
- Tetraulax junodi Breuning, 1950
- Tetraulax lateralis Jordan, 1903
- Tetraulax lateraloides Breuning, 1948
- Tetraulax maynei (Lepesme & Breuning, 1955)
- Tetraulax minor Breuning, 1958
- Tetraulax pictiventris (Chevrolat, 1857)
- Tetraulax rhodesiana Breuning, 1955
- Tetraulax rothi Lepesme & Breuning, 1955
- Tetraulax subunicolor Breuning, 1960
- Tetraulax unicolor Breuning, 1961
