= Tetraulax pictiventris =

Scientific classification
- Kingdom: Animalia
- Phylum: Arthropoda
- Class: Insecta
- Order: Coleoptera
- Suborder: Polyphaga
- Infraorder: Cucujiformia
- Family: Cerambycidae
- Genus: Tetraulax
- Species: T. pictiventris

Binomial name
- Tetraulax pictiventris (Chevrolat, 1857)

Species of beetle

Tetraulax pictiventris is a species of beetle in the family Cerambycidae. It was described by Chevrolat in 1857.
