= Tetraulax minor =

Scientific classification
- Kingdom: Animalia
- Phylum: Arthropoda
- Class: Insecta
- Order: Coleoptera
- Suborder: Polyphaga
- Infraorder: Cucujiformia
- Family: Cerambycidae
- Genus: Tetraulax
- Species: T. minor

Binomial name
- Tetraulax minor Breuning, 1958

Synonyms
- Tetraulax albofasciatoides Breuning, 1986

Species of beetle

Tetraulax minor is a species of beetle in the family Cerambycidae. It was described by Stephan von Breuning in 1958. It is known from Zambia and Kenya.
