= Brachyolene picta =

Scientific classification
- Kingdom: Animalia
- Phylum: Arthropoda
- Class: Insecta
- Order: Coleoptera
- Suborder: Polyphaga
- Infraorder: Cucujiformia
- Family: Cerambycidae
- Genus: Brachyolene
- Species: B. picta

Binomial name
- Brachyolene picta (Breuning, 1938)

Synonyms
- Tetraulax pictus Breuning, 1938

Species of beetle

Brachyolene picta is a species of beetle in the family Cerambycidae. It was described by Stephan von Breuning in 1938. It is known from Somalia.
