= Tetraulax maynei =

Scientific classification
- Kingdom: Animalia
- Phylum: Arthropoda
- Class: Insecta
- Order: Coleoptera
- Suborder: Polyphaga
- Infraorder: Cucujiformia
- Family: Cerambycidae
- Genus: Tetraulax
- Species: T. maynei

Binomial name
- Tetraulax maynei (Lepesme & Breuning, 1955)

Species of beetle

Tetraulax maynei is a species of beetle in the family Cerambycidae. It was described by Lepesme and Stephan von Breuning in 1955.
