= Tetraulaxini =

Scientific classification
- Kingdom: Animalia
- Phylum: Arthropoda
- Class: Insecta
- Order: Coleoptera
- Suborder: Polyphaga
- Infraorder: Cucujiformia
- Family: Cerambycidae
- Subfamily: Lamiinae
- Tribe: Tetraulaxini; Breuning & Téocchi, 1976

Tribe of beetles

Tetraulaxini is a tribe of longhorn beetles of the subfamily Lamiinae. It was described by Stephan von Breuning and Téocchi in 1976.

== Taxonomy ==
- Brachyolene Aurivillius, 1914
- Tetraulax Jordan, 1903
