= Brachyolene =

Scientific classification
- Kingdom: Animalia
- Phylum: Arthropoda
- Class: Insecta
- Order: Coleoptera
- Suborder: Polyphaga
- Infraorder: Cucujiformia
- Family: Cerambycidae
- Subfamily: Lamiinae
- Tribe: Tetraulaxini
- Genus: Brachyolene; Aurivillius, 1914

Genus of beetles

Brachyolene is a genus of longhorn beetles of the subfamily Lamiinae.

== Species ==
Containing the following species:

- Brachyolene albosignata Breuning, 1958
- Brachyolene albostictica Breuning, 1948
- Brachyolene brunnea Aurivillius, 1914
- Brachyolene capensis Breuning, 1970
- Brachyolene flavolineata Breuning, 1951
- Brachyolene nigrescens Breuning, 1977
- Brachyolene ochreosignata Breuning, 1940
- Brachyolene picta (Breuning, 1938)
- Brachyolene pictula Breuning, 1940
- Brachyolene seriemaculata Breuning, 1942
- Brachyolene unicolor Breuning, 1974
