= Tetraulax rhodesiana =

Scientific classification
- Kingdom: Animalia
- Phylum: Arthropoda
- Class: Insecta
- Order: Coleoptera
- Suborder: Polyphaga
- Infraorder: Cucujiformia
- Family: Cerambycidae
- Genus: Tetraulax
- Species: T. rhodesiana

Binomial name
- Tetraulax rhodesiana Breuning, 1955

Synonyms
- Tetraulax rhodesianus Breuning, 1955 (missp.)

Species of beetle

Tetraulax rhodesiana is a species of beetle in the family Cerambycidae. It was described by Stephan von Breuning in 1955.
