= Brachyolene brunnea =

Scientific classification
- Kingdom: Animalia
- Phylum: Arthropoda
- Class: Insecta
- Order: Coleoptera
- Suborder: Polyphaga
- Infraorder: Cucujiformia
- Family: Cerambycidae
- Genus: Brachyolene
- Species: B. brunnea

Binomial name
- Brachyolene brunnea Aurivillius, 1914

Species of beetle

Brachyolene brunnea is a species of beetle in the family Cerambycidae. It was described by Per Olof Christopher Aurivillius in 1914. It is known from the Central African Republic and Cameroon.
