= Brachyolene flavolineata =

Scientific classification
- Kingdom: Animalia
- Phylum: Arthropoda
- Class: Insecta
- Order: Coleoptera
- Suborder: Polyphaga
- Infraorder: Cucujiformia
- Family: Cerambycidae
- Genus: Brachyolene
- Species: B. flavolineata

Binomial name
- Brachyolene flavolineata Breuning, 1951

Species of beetle

Brachyolene flavolineata is a species of beetle in the family Cerambycidae. It was described by Stephan von Breuning in 1951. It is known from the Democratic Republic of the Congo.
