= Tetraulax albofasciata =

Scientific classification
- Kingdom: Animalia
- Phylum: Arthropoda
- Class: Insecta
- Order: Coleoptera
- Suborder: Polyphaga
- Infraorder: Cucujiformia
- Family: Cerambycidae
- Genus: Tetraulax
- Species: T. albofasciata

Binomial name
- Tetraulax albofasciata Breuning, 1935

Synonyms
- Tetraulax albofasciatus Breuning, 1935 (Missp.)

Species of beetle

Tetraulax albofasciata is a species of beetle in the family Cerambycidae. It was described by Stephan von Breuning in 1935.
