= Tetraulax lateralis =

Scientific classification
- Kingdom: Animalia
- Phylum: Arthropoda
- Class: Insecta
- Order: Coleoptera
- Suborder: Polyphaga
- Infraorder: Cucujiformia
- Family: Cerambycidae
- Genus: Tetraulax
- Species: T. lateralis

Binomial name
- Tetraulax lateralis Jordan, 1903

Species of beetle

Tetraulax lateralis is a species of beetle in the family Cerambycidae. It was described by Karl Jordan in 1903.
