= Brachyolene seriemaculata =

Scientific classification
- Kingdom: Animalia
- Phylum: Arthropoda
- Class: Insecta
- Order: Coleoptera
- Suborder: Polyphaga
- Infraorder: Cucujiformia
- Family: Cerambycidae
- Genus: Brachyolene
- Species: B. seriemaculata

Binomial name
- Brachyolene seriemaculata Breuning, 1942

Species of beetle

Brachyolene seriemaculata is a species of beetle in the family Cerambycidae. It was described by Stephan von Breuning in 1942. It is known from the Ivory Coast.
