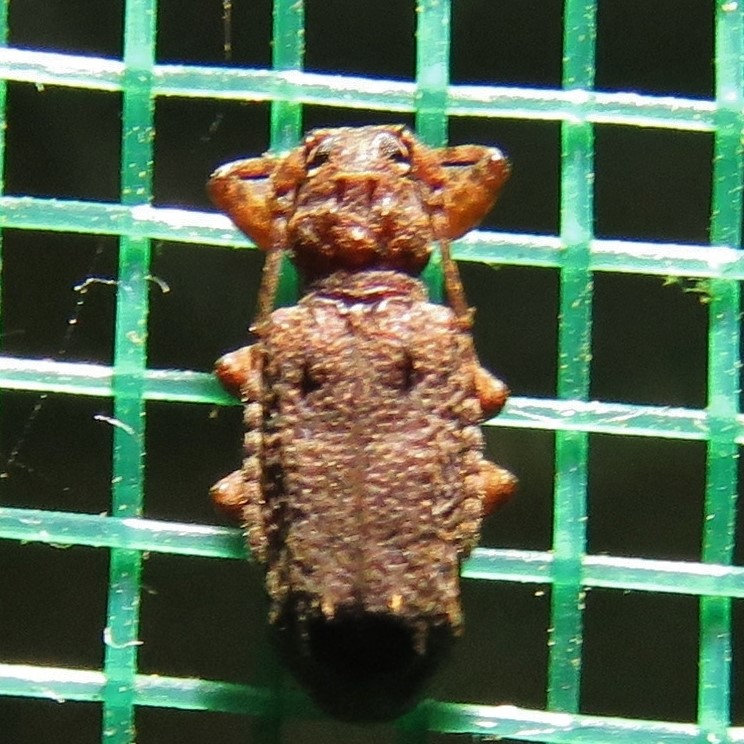

Scientific classification
- Kingdom: Animalia
- Phylum: Arthropoda
- Class: Insecta
- Order: Coleoptera
- Suborder: Polyphaga
- Infraorder: Cucujiformia
- Family: Cerambycidae
- Subfamily: Lamiinae
- Tribe: Eupromerini; Galileo & Martins, 1995

= Eupromerini =

Tribe of beetles

Eupromerini is a tribe of longhorn beetles of the subfamily Lamiinae.

== Taxonomy ==
- Eupromera
- Iquiracetima
- Neopibanga
- Pibanga
- Puanama
