= Iquiracetima rana =

Scientific classification
- Kingdom: Animalia
- Phylum: Arthropoda
- Class: Insecta
- Order: Coleoptera
- Suborder: Polyphaga
- Infraorder: Cucujiformia
- Family: Cerambycidae
- Genus: Iquiracetima
- Species: I. rana

Binomial name
- Iquiracetima rana Galileo & Martins, 2008

Species of beetle

Iquiracetima rana is a species of beetle in the family Cerambycidae. It was described by Galileo and Martins in 2008. This beetle is native to Bolivia.
