= Puanama =

Scientific classification
- Kingdom: Animalia
- Phylum: Arthropoda
- Class: Insecta
- Order: Coleoptera
- Suborder: Polyphaga
- Infraorder: Cucujiformia
- Family: Cerambycidae
- Tribe: Eupromerini
- Genus: Puanama

Genus of beetles

Puanama is a genus of longhorn beetles of the subfamily Lamiinae, containing the following species:

- Puanama caraca Galileo & Martins, 1995
- Puanama sara Galileo & Martins, 1998
- Puanama sinopia Galileo & Martins, 1995
