= Iquiracetima =

Scientific classification
- Kingdom: Animalia
- Phylum: Arthropoda
- Class: Insecta
- Order: Coleoptera
- Suborder: Polyphaga
- Infraorder: Cucujiformia
- Family: Cerambycidae
- Subfamily: Lamiinae
- Tribe: Eupromerini
- Genus: Iquiracetima; Galileo & Martins, 1995

Genus of beetles

Iquiracetima is a genus of longhorn beetles of the subfamily Lamiinae, containing the following species:

- Iquiracetima aspasia Galileo & Martins, 1995
- Iquiracetima brachialis (Thomson, 1868)
- Iquiracetima cerari Galileo & Martins, 2008
- Iquiracetima rana Galileo & Martins, 2008
- Iquiracetima tuberosa (Belon, 1896)
