= Eupromera disparilis =

Scientific classification
- Kingdom: Animalia
- Phylum: Arthropoda
- Class: Insecta
- Order: Coleoptera
- Suborder: Polyphaga
- Infraorder: Cucujiformia
- Family: Cerambycidae
- Genus: Eupromera
- Species: E. disparilis

Binomial name
- Eupromera disparilis Galileo & Martins, 1995

Species of beetle

Eupromera disparilis is a species of beetle in the family Cerambycidae. It was described by Galileo and Martins in 1995. It is known from Brazil.
