= Eupromera gilmouri =

Scientific classification
- Kingdom: Animalia
- Phylum: Arthropoda
- Class: Insecta
- Order: Coleoptera
- Suborder: Polyphaga
- Infraorder: Cucujiformia
- Family: Cerambycidae
- Genus: Eupromera
- Species: E. gilmouri

Binomial name
- Eupromera gilmouri E. Fuchs, 1961

Species of beetle

Eupromera gilmouri is a species of beetle in the family Cerambycidae. It was described by Ernst Fuchs in 1961. It is known from Brazil.
