= Pibanga transversefasciata =

Scientific classification
- Kingdom: Animalia
- Phylum: Arthropoda
- Class: Insecta
- Order: Coleoptera
- Suborder: Polyphaga
- Infraorder: Cucujiformia
- Family: Cerambycidae
- Genus: Pibanga
- Species: P. transversefasciata

Binomial name
- Pibanga transversefasciata (Breuning, 1943)

Species of beetle

Pibanga transversefasciata is a species of beetle in the family Cerambycidae. It was described by Stephan von Breuning in 1943. It is known from Brazil.
