= Iquiracetima brachialis =

Scientific classification
- Kingdom: Animalia
- Phylum: Arthropoda
- Class: Insecta
- Order: Coleoptera
- Suborder: Polyphaga
- Infraorder: Cucujiformia
- Family: Cerambycidae
- Genus: Iquiracetima
- Species: I. brachialis

Binomial name
- Iquiracetima brachialis (Thomson, 1868)

Synonyms
- Iquaracetima brachialis (Thomson, 1868)

Species of beetle

Iquiracetima brachialis is a species of beetle in the family Cerambycidae. It was described by Thomson in 1868. It is known from Brazil.
