= Pibanga costulata =

Scientific classification
- Kingdom: Animalia
- Phylum: Arthropoda
- Class: Insecta
- Order: Coleoptera
- Suborder: Polyphaga
- Infraorder: Cucujiformia
- Family: Cerambycidae
- Genus: Pibanga
- Species: P. costulata

Binomial name
- Pibanga costulata (Belon, 1896)

Species of beetle

Pibanga costulata is a species of beetle in the family Cerambycidae. It was described by Belon in 1896. It is known from Bolivia.
