= Pibanga =

Scientific classification
- Kingdom: Animalia
- Phylum: Arthropoda
- Class: Insecta
- Order: Coleoptera
- Suborder: Polyphaga
- Infraorder: Cucujiformia
- Family: Cerambycidae
- Subfamily: Lamiinae
- Tribe: Eupromerini
- Genus: Pibanga; Galileo & Martins, 1995

Genus of beetles

Pibanga is a genus of longhorn beetles of the subfamily Lamiinae, containing the following species:

- Pibanga costulata (Belon, 1896)
- Pibanga diamantina Galileo & Martins, 1995
- Pibanga glabricula (Bates, 1885)
- Pibanga itacoatiara Galileo & Martins, 1995
- Pibanga jacareacanga Galileo & Martins, 1995
- Pibanga ochropyga (Belon, 1896)
- Pibanga transversefasciata (Breuning, 1943)
