= Eupromera spryana =

Scientific classification
- Kingdom: Animalia
- Phylum: Arthropoda
- Clade: Pancrustacea
- Class: Insecta
- Order: Coleoptera
- Suborder: Polyphaga
- Infraorder: Cucujiformia
- Family: Cerambycidae
- Genus: Eupromera
- Species: E. spryana

Binomial name
- Eupromera spryana Westwood, 1846

Species of beetle

Eupromera spryana is a species of beetle in the family Cerambycidae. It was described by John O. Westwood in 1846. It is known from Brazil. This species was named in honour of W. Spry, a scientific illustrator and member of the Royal Entomological Society.
