= Eupromera =

Scientific classification
- Kingdom: Animalia
- Phylum: Arthropoda
- Class: Insecta
- Order: Coleoptera
- Suborder: Polyphaga
- Infraorder: Cucujiformia
- Family: Cerambycidae
- Subfamily: Lamiinae
- Tribe: Eupromerini
- Genus: Eupromera; Westwood, 1846

Genus of beetles

Eupromera is a genus of longhorn beetles of the subfamily Lamiinae, containing the following species:

- Eupromera disparilis Galileo & Martins, 1995
- Eupromera gilmouri Fuchs, 1961
- Eupromera similis Breuning, 1940
- Eupromera spryana Westwood, 1846
- Eupromera zonula Galileo & Martins, 1995
