= Iquiracetima tuberosa =

Scientific classification
- Kingdom: Animalia
- Phylum: Arthropoda
- Class: Insecta
- Order: Coleoptera
- Suborder: Polyphaga
- Infraorder: Cucujiformia
- Family: Cerambycidae
- Genus: Iquiracetima
- Species: I. tuberosa

Binomial name
- Iquiracetima tuberosa (Belon, 1896)

Synonyms
- Iquaracetima tuberosa (Belon, 1896)

Species of beetle

Iquiracetima tuberosa is a species of beetle in the family Cerambycidae. It was described by Belon in 1896 (129 years ago). It is known from Ecuador, Bolivia, and Brazil.
