= Iquiracetima aspasia =

Scientific classification
- Kingdom: Animalia
- Phylum: Arthropoda
- Class: Insecta
- Order: Coleoptera
- Suborder: Polyphaga
- Infraorder: Cucujiformia
- Family: Cerambycidae
- Genus: Iquiracetima
- Species: I. aspasia

Binomial name
- Iquiracetima aspasia Galileo & Martins, 1995

Synonyms
- Iquaracetima aspasia Galileo & Martins, 1995

Species of beetle

Iquiracetima aspasia is a species of beetle in the family Cerambycidae. It was described by Galileo and Martins in 1995. It is known from Ecuador and Peru.
