= Puanama sara =

Scientific classification
- Kingdom: Animalia
- Phylum: Arthropoda
- Class: Insecta
- Order: Coleoptera
- Suborder: Polyphaga
- Infraorder: Cucujiformia
- Family: Cerambycidae
- Genus: Puanama
- Species: P. sara

Binomial name
- Puanama sara Galileo & Martins, 1998

Species of beetle

Puanama sara is a species of beetle in the family Cerambycidae. It was described by Galileo and Martins in 1998. It is known from Bolivia.
