= Neopibanga =

Scientific classification
- Kingdom: Animalia
- Phylum: Arthropoda
- Class: Insecta
- Order: Coleoptera
- Suborder: Polyphaga
- Infraorder: Cucujiformia
- Family: Cerambycidae
- Genus: Neopibanga
- Species: N. brescoviti

Binomial name
- Neopibanga brescoviti Martins & Galileo, 1998

Genus of beetles

Neopibanga brescoviti is a species of beetle in the family Cerambycidae, and the only species in the genus Neopibanga. It was described by Martins and Galileo in 1998.
