= Mauesia submetallica =

Scientific classification
- Kingdom: Animalia
- Phylum: Arthropoda
- Class: Insecta
- Order: Coleoptera
- Suborder: Polyphaga
- Infraorder: Cucujiformia
- Family: Cerambycidae
- Genus: Mauesia
- Species: M. submetallica

Binomial name
- Mauesia submetallica Martins & Galileo, 2010

Species of beetle

Mauesia submetallica is a species of beetle in the family Cerambycidae. It was described by Martins and Galileo in 2010.
