= Taurolema rutilans =

Scientific classification
- Kingdom: Animalia
- Phylum: Arthropoda
- Class: Insecta
- Order: Coleoptera
- Suborder: Polyphaga
- Infraorder: Cucujiformia
- Family: Cerambycidae
- Genus: Taurolema
- Species: T. rutilans

Binomial name
- Taurolema rutilans Gounelle, 1906

Species of beetle

Taurolema rutilans is a species of beetle in the family Cerambycidae. It was described by Gounelle in 1906. It is known from Brazil.
