= Taurolema olivacea =

Scientific classification
- Kingdom: Animalia
- Phylum: Arthropoda
- Class: Insecta
- Order: Coleoptera
- Suborder: Polyphaga
- Infraorder: Cucujiformia
- Family: Cerambycidae
- Genus: Taurolema
- Species: T. olivacea

Binomial name
- Taurolema olivacea Gounelle, 1908

Species of beetle

Taurolema olivacea is a species of beetle in the family Cerambycidae. It was described by Gounelle in 1908. It is one of 10 species of Taurolema from Brazil.
