= Taurolema pretiosa =

Scientific classification
- Kingdom: Animalia
- Phylum: Arthropoda
- Class: Insecta
- Order: Coleoptera
- Suborder: Polyphaga
- Infraorder: Cucujiformia
- Family: Cerambycidae
- Genus: Taurolema
- Species: T. pretiosa

Binomial name
- Taurolema pretiosa Chevrolat, 1861

Species of beetle

Taurolema pretiosa is a species of beetle in the family Cerambycidae. It was described by Chevrolat in 1861. It is known from Colombia and Venezuela.
