= Mauesia acorniculata =

Scientific classification
- Kingdom: Animalia
- Phylum: Arthropoda
- Class: Insecta
- Order: Coleoptera
- Suborder: Polyphaga
- Infraorder: Cucujiformia
- Family: Cerambycidae
- Genus: Mauesia
- Species: M. acorniculata

Binomial name
- Mauesia acorniculata Julio, 2003

Species of beetle

Mauesia acorniculata is a species of beetle in the family Cerambycidae. It was described by Julio in 2003. It is known from Brazil.
