= Taurolema hirsuticornis =

Scientific classification
- Kingdom: Animalia
- Phylum: Arthropoda
- Clade: Pancrustacea
- Class: Insecta
- Order: Coleoptera
- Suborder: Polyphaga
- Infraorder: Cucujiformia
- Family: Cerambycidae
- Genus: Taurolema
- Species: T. hirsuticornis

Binomial name
- Taurolema hirsuticornis Chevrolat, 1861

Species of beetle

Taurolema hirsuticornis is a species of beetle in the family Cerambycidae. It was described by Chevrolat in 1861. It is found in Brazil (Goiás, Minas Gerais, Espírito Santo, Rio de Janeiro, São Paulo, Paraná, Rio Grande do Sul), Paraguay and Argentina (Misiones).
