= Taurolema nigroviolacea =

Scientific classification
- Kingdom: Animalia
- Phylum: Arthropoda
- Class: Insecta
- Order: Coleoptera
- Suborder: Polyphaga
- Infraorder: Cucujiformia
- Family: Cerambycidae
- Genus: Taurolema
- Species: T. nigroviolacea

Binomial name
- Taurolema nigroviolacea Touroult & Tavakilian, 2006

Species of beetle

Taurolema nigroviolacea is a species of beetle in the family Cerambycidae. It was described by Touroult and Tavakilian in 2006. It is known from French Guiana.
