= Taurolema nigropilosa =

Scientific classification
- Kingdom: Animalia
- Phylum: Arthropoda
- Class: Insecta
- Order: Coleoptera
- Suborder: Polyphaga
- Infraorder: Cucujiformia
- Family: Cerambycidae
- Genus: Taurolema
- Species: T. nigropilosa

Binomial name
- Taurolema nigropilosa Julio, 2003

Species of beetle

Taurolema nigropilosa is a species of beetle in the family Cerambycidae. It was described by Julio in 2003. It is known from Brazil.
