= Mauesia =

Scientific classification
- Kingdom: Animalia
- Phylum: Arthropoda
- Class: Insecta
- Order: Coleoptera
- Suborder: Polyphaga
- Infraorder: Cucujiformia
- Family: Cerambycidae
- Subfamily: Lamiinae
- Tribe: Mauesiini
- Genus: Mauesia; Lane, 1956

Genus of beetles

Mauesia is a genus of longhorn beetles of the subfamily Lamiinae, containing the following species:

- Mauesia acorniculata Julio, 2003
- Mauesia bicornis Julio, 2003
- Mauesia cornuta Lane, 1956
- Mauesia panamensis Moyses & Galileo, 2009
- Mauesia simplicis Moyses & Galileo, 2009
- Mauesia submetallica Martins & Galileo, 2010
