= Coroicoia =

Scientific classification
- Kingdom: Animalia
- Phylum: Arthropoda
- Class: Insecta
- Order: Coleoptera
- Suborder: Polyphaga
- Infraorder: Cucujiformia
- Family: Cerambycidae
- Subfamily: Lamiinae
- Tribe: Mauesiini
- Genus: Coroicoia; Lane, 1966
- Species: C. ligata

Binomial name
- Coroicoia ligata (Schwarzer, 1930)

Synonyms
- Taurolema ligata Schwarzer, 1930

Genus of beetles

Coroicoia ligata is a species of beetle in the family Cerambycidae, and the only species in the genus Coroicoia. The species was described by Schwarzer in 1930.
