= Taurolema cicatricosa =

Scientific classification
- Kingdom: Animalia
- Phylum: Arthropoda
- Class: Insecta
- Order: Coleoptera
- Suborder: Polyphaga
- Infraorder: Cucujiformia
- Family: Cerambycidae
- Genus: Taurolema
- Species: T. cicatricosa

Binomial name
- Taurolema cicatricosa Lane, 1966

Synonyms
- Taurolema lineata Fuchs, 1966

Species of beetle

Taurolema cicatricosa is a species of beetle in the family Cerambycidae. It was described by Lane in 1966. It is known from Guyana, French Guiana, and Brazil.
