= Taurolema flavocincta =

Scientific classification
- Kingdom: Animalia
- Phylum: Arthropoda
- Class: Insecta
- Order: Coleoptera
- Suborder: Polyphaga
- Infraorder: Cucujiformia
- Family: Cerambycidae
- Genus: Taurolema
- Species: T. flavocincta

Binomial name
- Taurolema flavocincta Gounelle, 1906

Synonyms
- Taurolema vittata Schwarzer, 1930; Taurolema peruviana Lane, 1957

Species of beetle

Taurolema flavocincta is a species of beetle in the family Cerambycidae. It was described by Gounelle in 1906. It is known from Ecuador, Colombia, Brazil, Panama, Costa Rica, and Peru.
