= Taurolema =

Scientific classification
- Kingdom: Animalia
- Phylum: Arthropoda
- Class: Insecta
- Order: Coleoptera
- Suborder: Polyphaga
- Infraorder: Cucujiformia
- Family: Cerambycidae
- Subfamily: Lamiinae
- Tribe: Mauesiini
- Genus: Taurolema; Thomson, 1860

Genus of beetles

Taurolema is a genus of longhorn beetles of the subfamily Lamiinae, containing the following species:

- Taurolema albopunctata Gounelle, 1906
- Taurolema bellatrix Thomson, 1860
- Taurolema cicatricosa Lane, 1966
- Taurolema dalensi Touroult & Tavakilian, 2006
- Taurolema duffyi Lane, 1966
- Taurolema flavocincta Gounelle, 1906
- Taurolema hirsuticornis Chevrolat, 1861
- Taurolema nigropilosa Julio, 2003
- Taurolema nigroviolacea Touroult & Tavakilian, 2006
- Taurolema oberthuri Gounelle, 1906
- Taurolema olivacea Gounelle, 1908
- Taurolema pretiosa Chevrolat, 1861
- Taurolema rutilans Gounelle, 1906
- Taurolema seabrai Lane, 1973
- Taurolema superba Fuchs, 1966
