= Mauesia simplicis =

Scientific classification
- Kingdom: Animalia
- Phylum: Arthropoda
- Class: Insecta
- Order: Coleoptera
- Suborder: Polyphaga
- Infraorder: Cucujiformia
- Family: Cerambycidae
- Genus: Mauesia
- Species: M. simplicis

Binomial name
- Mauesia simplicis Moyses & Galileo, 2009

Species of beetle

Mauesia simplicis is a species of beetle in the family Cerambycidae. It was described by Moyses and Galileo in 2009.
