= Mauesiini =

Scientific classification
- Kingdom: Animalia
- Phylum: Arthropoda
- Class: Insecta
- Order: Coleoptera
- Suborder: Polyphaga
- Infraorder: Cucujiformia
- Family: Cerambycidae
- Subfamily: Lamiinae
- Tribe: Mauesiini; Lane, 1956

Tribe of beetles

Mauesiini is a tribe of longhorn beetles of the subfamily Lamiinae.

== Taxonomy ==
- Coroicoia
- Mauesia
- Taurolema
- Trichomauesia
