= Taurolema bellatrix =

Scientific classification
- Kingdom: Animalia
- Phylum: Arthropoda
- Class: Insecta
- Order: Coleoptera
- Suborder: Polyphaga
- Infraorder: Cucujiformia
- Family: Cerambycidae
- Genus: Taurolema
- Species: T. bellatrix

Binomial name
- Taurolema bellatrix Thomson, 1860

Species of beetle

Taurolema bellatrix is a species of beetle in the family Cerambycidae. It was described by James Thomson in 1860. It is known from Brazil and French Guiana.
