= Mauesia cornuta =

Scientific classification
- Kingdom: Animalia
- Phylum: Arthropoda
- Class: Insecta
- Order: Coleoptera
- Suborder: Polyphaga
- Infraorder: Cucujiformia
- Family: Cerambycidae
- Genus: Mauesia
- Species: M. cornuta

Binomial name
- Mauesia cornuta Lane, 1956

Species of beetle

Mauesia cornuta is a species of beetle in the family Cerambycidae. It was described by Lane in 1956. It is known from French Guiana and Brazil.
