= Taurolema superba =

Scientific classification
- Kingdom: Animalia
- Phylum: Arthropoda
- Class: Insecta
- Order: Coleoptera
- Suborder: Polyphaga
- Infraorder: Cucujiformia
- Family: Cerambycidae
- Genus: Taurolema
- Species: T. superba

Binomial name
- Taurolema superba E. Fuchs, 1966

Species of beetle

Taurolema superba is a species of beetle in the family Cerambycidae. It was described by Ernst Fuchs in 1966. It is known from Peru.
