= Sophronica brunnea =

Scientific classification
- Domain: Eukaryota
- Kingdom: Animalia
- Phylum: Arthropoda
- Class: Insecta
- Order: Coleoptera
- Suborder: Polyphaga
- Infraorder: Cucujiformia
- Family: Cerambycidae
- Genus: Sophronica
- Species: S. brunnea

Binomial name
- Sophronica brunnea (Fisher, 1940)

Species of beetle

Sophronica brunnea is a species of beetle in the family Cerambycidae. It was described by Fisher in 1940.
