= Sophronica bowringi =

Scientific classification
- Domain: Eukaryota
- Kingdom: Animalia
- Phylum: Arthropoda
- Class: Insecta
- Order: Coleoptera
- Suborder: Polyphaga
- Infraorder: Cucujiformia
- Family: Cerambycidae
- Genus: Sophronica
- Species: S. bowringi

Binomial name
- Sophronica bowringi (Gressitt, 1939)

Species of beetle

Sophronica bowringi is a species of beetle in the family Cerambycidae. It was described by Gressitt in 1939.
