= Sophronica exocentroides =

Scientific classification
- Kingdom: Animalia
- Phylum: Arthropoda
- Class: Insecta
- Order: Coleoptera
- Suborder: Polyphaga
- Infraorder: Cucujiformia
- Family: Cerambycidae
- Genus: Sophronica
- Species: S. exocentroides

Binomial name
- Sophronica exocentroides Breuning & Téocchi, 1973

Species of beetle

Sophronica exocentroides is a species of beetle in the family Cerambycidae. It was described by Stephan von Breuning and Téocchi in 1973.
