= Sophronica fuscofasciata =

Scientific classification
- Kingdom: Animalia
- Phylum: Arthropoda
- Class: Insecta
- Order: Coleoptera
- Suborder: Polyphaga
- Infraorder: Cucujiformia
- Family: Cerambycidae
- Genus: Sophronica
- Species: S. fuscofasciata

Binomial name
- Sophronica fuscofasciata Lepesme & Breuning, 1956

Species of beetle

Sophronica fuscofasciata is a species of beetle in the family Cerambycidae. It was described by Lepesme and Stephan von Breuning in 1956.
