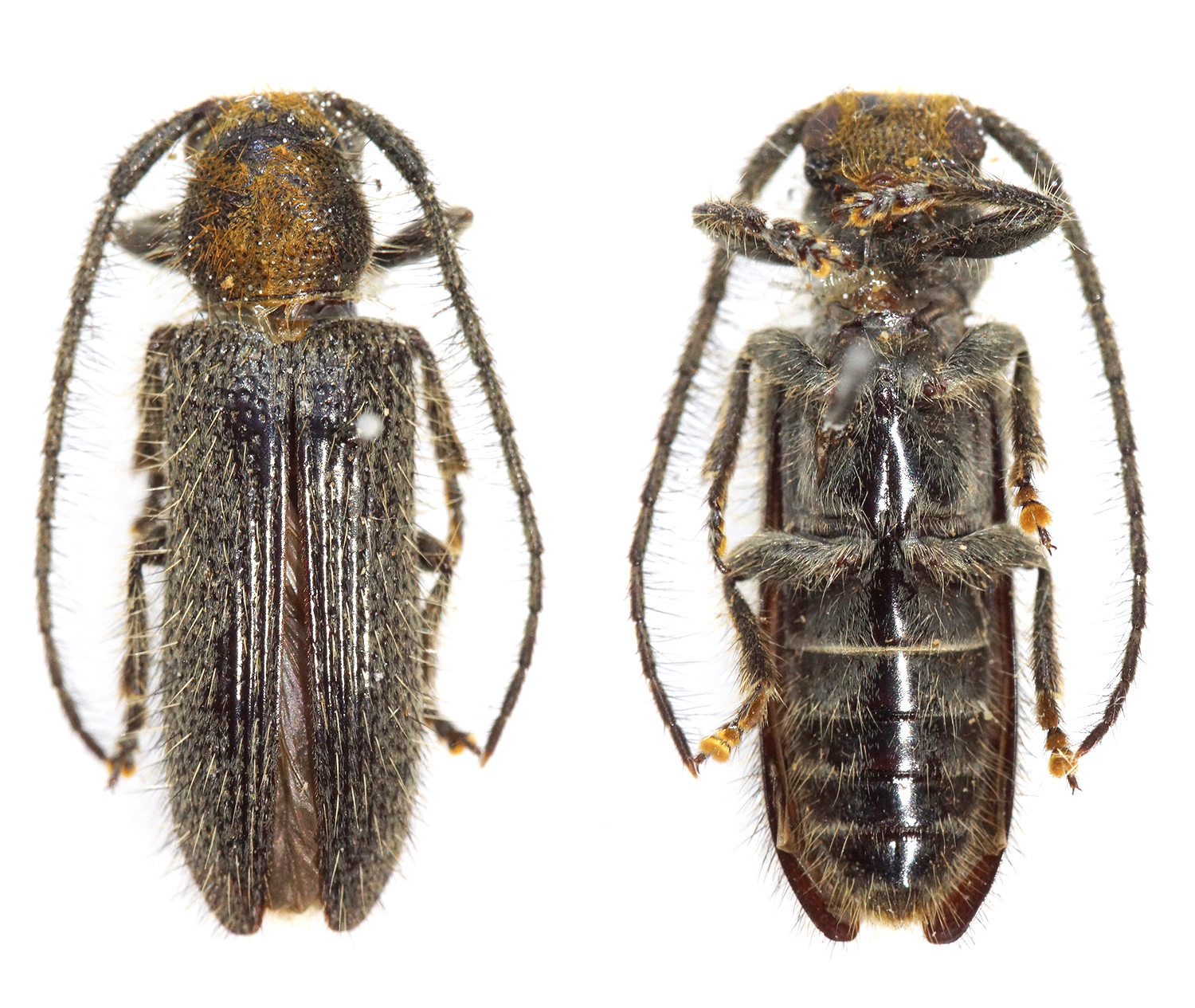
- Female specimen.

Scientific classification
- Domain: Eukaryota
- Kingdom: Animalia
- Phylum: Arthropoda
- Class: Insecta
- Order: Coleoptera
- Suborder: Polyphaga
- Infraorder: Cucujiformia
- Family: Cerambycidae
- Genus: Sophronica
- Species: S. costulata

Binomial name
- Sophronica costulata (Quedenfeldt, 1882)

= Sophronica costulata =

Species of beetle

Sophronica costulata is a species of beetle in the family Cerambycidae. It was described by Quedenfeldt in 1882.
