= Sophronica exigua =

Scientific classification
- Domain: Eukaryota
- Kingdom: Animalia
- Phylum: Arthropoda
- Class: Insecta
- Order: Coleoptera
- Suborder: Polyphaga
- Infraorder: Cucujiformia
- Family: Cerambycidae
- Genus: Sophronica
- Species: S. exigua

Binomial name
- Sophronica exigua Aurivillius, 1907

Species of beetle

Sophronica exigua is a species of beetle in the family Cerambycidae. It was described by Per Olof Christopher Aurivillius in 1907.
