= Sophronica hirsuta =

Scientific classification
- Domain: Eukaryota
- Kingdom: Animalia
- Phylum: Arthropoda
- Class: Insecta
- Order: Coleoptera
- Suborder: Polyphaga
- Infraorder: Cucujiformia
- Family: Cerambycidae
- Genus: Sophronica
- Species: S. hirsuta

Binomial name
- Sophronica hirsuta (Pascoe, 1864)

Synonyms
- Elithiotes hirsuta Pascoe, 1864; Sophronica flavicoma Teocchi, 1986; Sophronica paruniformis Breuning, 1977; Sophronica subflavescens Breuning, 1987

Species of beetle

Sophronica hirsuta is a species of beetle in the family Cerambycidae. It was described by Francis Polkinghorne Pascoe in 1864, originally under the genus Elithiotes.
