= Sophronica humeralis =

Scientific classification
- Kingdom: Animalia
- Phylum: Arthropoda
- Class: Insecta
- Order: Coleoptera
- Suborder: Polyphaga
- Infraorder: Cucujiformia
- Family: Cerambycidae
- Genus: Sophronica
- Species: S. humeralis

Binomial name
- Sophronica humeralis Breuning, 1940

Species of beetle

Sophronica humeralis is a species of beetle in the family Cerambycidae, originating from Central Africa. It was described by Stephan von Breuning in 1940.
