= Sophronica rufulescens =

Scientific classification
- Kingdom: Animalia
- Phylum: Arthropoda
- Class: Insecta
- Order: Coleoptera
- Suborder: Polyphaga
- Infraorder: Cucujiformia
- Family: Cerambycidae
- Genus: Sophronica
- Species: S. rufulescens

Binomial name
- Sophronica rufulescens Breuning, 1940

Species of beetle

Sophronica rufulescens is a species of beetle in the family Cerambycidae. It was described by Stephan von Breuning in 1940. It feeds on the Monterey pine.

== Subspecies ==
- Sophronica rufulescens annulicornis Breuning, 1956
- Sophronica rufulescens posttriangularis Breuning, 1974
- Sophronica rufulescens rufulescens Breuning, 1940
