= Sophronica bambusae =

Scientific classification
- Domain: Eukaryota
- Kingdom: Animalia
- Phylum: Arthropoda
- Class: Insecta
- Order: Coleoptera
- Suborder: Polyphaga
- Infraorder: Cucujiformia
- Family: Cerambycidae
- Genus: Sophronica
- Species: S. bambusae

Binomial name
- Sophronica bambusae Teocchi, Sudre & Jiroux, 2010

Species of beetle

Sophronica bambusae is a species of beetle in the family Cerambycidae. It was described by Teocchi, Sudre and Jiroux in 2010.
