= Sophronica =

- Sophronica sp. in suburban Pretoria, South Africa

Scientific classification
- Kingdom: Animalia
- Phylum: Arthropoda
- Class: Insecta
- Order: Coleoptera
- Suborder: Polyphaga
- Infraorder: Cucujiformia
- Family: Cerambycidae
- Tribe: Desmiphorini
- Genus: Sophronica; Blanchard, 1845

Type species
- Sophronica calceata Chevrolat, 1855

Synonyms
- Dasyo Pascoe, 1858; Dasystola Kolbe, 1894; Dimbrokoa Pic, 1944; Elithiotes Pasco, 1864; Eupogonioides Fisher, 1930; Mimanasthetis Pic, 1926; Phunginus Pic, 1922

Genus of beetles

Sophronica is a genus of longhorn beetles of the subfamily Lamiinae, containing the following species:

- Sophronica abyssinica Breuning, 1966
- Sophronica abyssiniensis Breuning, 1977
- Sophronica aeneipennis Breuning, 1963
- Sophronica alboapicalis Breuning, 1940
- Sophronica albohirta Breuning, 1961
- Sophronica albomaculata Breuning, 1970
- Sophronica albomaculosa Téocchi, 1986
- Sophronica albomarmorata Breuning, 1955
- Sophronica albopicta Breuning, 1940
- Sophronica albopunctata Breuning, 1949
- Sophronica albostictica Breuning, 1942
- Sophronica albostictipennis Breuning, 1959
- Sophronica allardi Breuning, 1974
- Sophronica amplipennis Pascoe, 1888
- Sophronica angusticollis Aurivillius, 1928
- Sophronica antenigra Breuning, 1981
- Sophronica antennalis Breuning, 1940
- Sophronica anteochracea Breuning, 1966
- Sophronica apicalis Pic, 1922
- Sophronica apicefusca Báguena & Breuning, 1958
- Sophronica apicemarmorata Breuning, 1954
- Sophronica apicenigra Báguena & Breuning, 1958
- Sophronica apimaculata Breuning, 1986
- Sophronica arabica Breuning, 1962
- Sophronica asmarensis Breuning, 1954
- Sophronica assamensis Breuning, 1966
- Sophronica atripennis (Pic, 1926)
- Sophronica aureicollis Breuning, 1956
- Sophronica aureovittata Aurivillius, 1907
- Sophronica aurescens Breuning, 1968
- Sophronica bambusae Teocchi, Sudre & Jiroux, 2010
- Sophronica basigranulata Breuning, 1940
- Sophronica benitoensis Báguena & Breuning, 1958
- Sophronica benjamini Breuning, 1966
- Sophronica bettoni Gahan, 1898
- Sophronica bicolor Báguena & Breuning, 1958
- Sophronica bicoloricornis Pic, 1944
- Sophronica bicoloripes (Pic, 1928)
- Sophronica bifoveata Aurivillius, 1914
- Sophronica bifuscomaculata Breuning, 1952
- Sophronica bimaculipennis (Breuning, 1955)
- Sophronica binigromaculipennis Breuning, 1963
- Sophronica binigrovittipennis Breuning, 1964
- Sophronica bipuncticollis Breuning, 1959
- Sophronica bituberculata Breuning, 1959
- Sophronica bituberosa Breuning, 1952
- Sophronica bowringi (Gressitt, 1939)
- Sophronica breuningi Pic, 1944
- Sophronica brunnea (Fisher, 1940)
- Sophronica brunnescens Breuning, 1969
- Sophronica calceata Chevrolat, 1855
- Sophronica calceoides Lepesme & Breuning, 1952
- Sophronica camerunica Breuning, 1959
- Sophronica cantaloubei Breuning, 1958
- Sophronica carbonaria Pascoe, 1864
- Sophronica carissae (Fisher, 1930)
- Sophronica cephalotes Breuning, 1940
- Sophronica ceylanica Breuning, 1971
- Sophronica chinensis Breuning, 1940
- Sophronica cinerascens Breuning, 1940
- Sophronica coeruleipennis Breuning, 1940
- Sophronica collarti Breuning, 1948
- Sophronica conradti Aurivillius, 1907
- Sophronica costipennis Breuning, 1940
- Sophronica costulata (Quedenfeldt, 1882)
- Sophronica crampeli Pic, 1944
- Sophronica cuprea Breuning, 1954
- Sophronica cylindricollis Breuning, 1954
- Sophronica debeckeri Breuning, 1975
- Sophronica delamarei Lepesme & Breuning, 1951
- Sophronica densepunctata Breuning, 1977
- Sophronica disconigra Breuning, 1958
- Sophronica diversepunctata Breuning, 1956
- Sophronica diversipes (Pic, 1929)
- Sophronica dorsovittata Breuning, 1940
- Sophronica egenus Holzschuh, 2006
- Sophronica elongatissima Breuning, 1942
- Sophronica exigua Aurivillius, 1907
- Sophronica exocentroides Breuning & Téocchi, 1973
- Sophronica fallaciosa Breuning, 1939
- Sophronica favareli Pic, 1944
- Sophronica feai Breuning, 1943
- Sophronica fimbriata Breuning, 1940
- Sophronica flava Breuning, 1942
- Sophronica flavescens Breuning, 1981
- Sophronica flavipennis Breuning, 1952
- Sophronica flavofemorata Breuning, 1956
- Sophronica flavoides Breuning, 1961
- Sophronica flavomaculata Breuning, 1964
- Sophronica flavostictica (Breuning, 1954)
- Sophronica flavovittata Breuning, 1981
- Sophronica forticornis Breuning, 1975
- Sophronica fulvicollis Gahan, 1904
- Sophronica funebris Breuning, 1954
- Sophronica fusca Kolbe, 1893
- Sophronica fuscifrons Breuning, 1969
- Sophronica fuscipennis Breuning, 1969
- Sophronica fuscoapicalis Breuning, 1955
- Sophronica fuscodiscalis Breuning, 1969
- Sophronica fuscofasciata Lepesme & Breuning, 1956
- Sophronica fuscolateralis Breuning, 1940
- Sophronica fuscoscapa Breuning, 1953
- Sophronica fuscovittata Breuning, 1958
- Sophronica gracilior Breuning, 1940
- Sophronica gracilis Breuning, 1940
- Sophronica gracillima Breuning, 1943
- Sophronica granulosipennis Breuning, 1968
- Sophronica grisea Aurivillius, 1908
- Sophronica griseoides Breuning, 1986
- Sophronica griseomarmorata Breuning, 1966
- Sophronica grossepunctata Breuning, 1940
- Sophronica grossepuncticollis Breuning, 1961
- Sophronica grossepunctipennis Breuning, 1973
- Sophronica hirsuta (Pascoe, 1864)
- Sophronica hirsutula Breuning, 1954
- Sophronica hologrisea Breuning, 1978
- Sophronica humeralis Breuning, 1940
- Sophronica ikuthensis Breuning, 1966
- Sophronica improba Pascoe,
- Sophronica indica Breuning, 1940
- Sophronica infrafusca Breuning, 1950
- Sophronica infrarufa Breuning, 1961
- Sophronica intricata Aurivillius, 1928
- Sophronica junodi Breuning, 1950
- Sophronica kaszabi Breuning, 1972
- Sophronica kivuensis Breuning, 1940
- Sophronica kochi Breuning, 1981
- Sophronica koreana Gressitt, 1951
- Sophronica laterifusca Breuning, 1939
- Sophronica laterifuscipennis Breuning, 1959
- Sophronica latior Breuning, 1986
- Sophronica leonensis Breuning, 1940
- Sophronica lineata Pascoe, 1858
- Sophronica longeantennata Breuning, 1940
- Sophronica longiliscapus Breuning, 1968
- Sophronica longiscapus Breuning, 1943
- Sophronica machadoi Lepesme, 1953
- Sophronica maculosa Pic, 1944
- Sophronica madagascariensis Breuning, 1940
- Sophronica madecassa Breuning, 1957
- Sophronica major Breuning, 1940
- Sophronica mauretanica Breuning, 1942
- Sophronica mediorufoantennata Breuning, 1968
- Sophronica microphthalma Breuning, 1940
- Sophronica minuta Kolbe, 1893
- Sophronica mirei Breuning & Villiers, 1960
- Sophronica moheliana Breuning, 1957
- Sophronica musae Hintz, 1919
- Sophronica nguruensis Breuning, 1964
- Sophronica nigriceps Breuning, 1940
- Sophronica nigricollis Breuning, 1940
- Sophronica nigricornis Breuning, 1943
- Sophronica nigritarsis Báguena & Breuning, 1958
- Sophronica nigriticollis Breuning, 1949
- Sophronica nigritula Breuning, 1940
- Sophronica nigroapicalis Breuning, 1940
- Sophronica nigrobivitta Breuning, 1940
- Sophronica nigromaculipennis Breuning, 1968
- Sophronica nigrosetosa Breuning, 1940
- Sophronica nigrosternalis Breuning, 1954
- Sophronica nigrosuturalis Breuning, 1939
- Sophronica nigrovittata Breuning, 1982
- Sophronica nitida Aurivillius, 1907
- Sophronica obrioides Bates, 1873
- Sophronica ochreiceps Breuning, 1951
- Sophronica ochreicollis Breuning, 1966
- Sophronica ochreofemorata Breuning, 1969
- Sophronica ochreoscutellaris Breuning, 1940
- Sophronica ochreovertex Breuning, 1967
- Sophronica ochreovitticollis Breuning, 1951
- Sophronica olivacea Báguena & Breuning, 1958
- Sophronica paracamerunica Breuning, 1977
- Sophronica parallela Breuning, 1954
- Sophronica parterufoantennalis Breuning, 1968
- Sophronica paupercula Holzschuh, 2006
- Sophronica persimilis Breuning, 1940
- Sophronica pienaari Distant, 1898
- Sophronica postscutellaris Breuning, 1954
- Sophronica pretiosa Breuning, 1959
- Sophronica pseudintricata Breuning, 1940
- Sophronica pulchra Breuning, 1954
- Sophronica punctatostriata Breuning, 1948
- Sophronica pusilloides Breuning, 1977
- Sophronica raffrayi Breuning, 1970
- Sophronica reducta Pascoe, 1888
- Sophronica renaudi Breuning, 1961
- Sophronica rhodesiana Breuning, 1953
- Sophronica richardmolardi Lepesme & Breuning, 1952
- Sophronica rubida Breuning, 1940
- Sophronica rubroscapa Hunt & Breuning, 1966
- Sophronica rufescens (Pic, 1926)
- Sophronica ruficeps Breuning, 1940
- Sophronica rufina Breuning, 1981
- Sophronica rufiniceps Breuning, 1949
- Sophronica rufipennis Aurivillius, 1926
- Sophronica rufiscape Breuning, 1981
- Sophronica rufobasalis Breuning, 1940
- Sophronica rufobasiantennalis Breuning, 1948
- Sophronica rufofemoralis Breuning, 1969
- Sophronica rufofemorata Breuning, 1954
- Sophronica rufohumeralis Breuning, 1981
- Sophronica rufooccipitalis Breuning, 1966
- Sophronica rufoscapa Aurivillius, 1907
- Sophronica rufosuturalis Breuning, 1954
- Sophronica rufotibialis Breuning, 1954
- Sophronica rufula Breuning, 1940
- Sophronica rufulescens Breuning, 1940
- Sophronica rufuloides Lepesme & Breuning, 1951
- Sophronica ruwenzorii Breuning, 1966
- Sophronica sansibarica Breuning, 1939
- Sophronica schrepferi Breuning, 1964
- Sophronica scotti Breuning, 1940
- Sophronica sericans Breuning, 1940
- Sophronica setosa Breuning, 1940
- Sophronica somaliensis Breuning, 1943
- Sophronica sparsepilosa Pic, 1944
- Sophronica spinipennis Breuning, 1940
- Sophronica strandi Breuning, 1940
- Sophronica striatopunctata Hunt & Breuning, 1957
- Sophronica subaureicollis Breuning, 1967
- Sophronica subaureovittata Breuning, 1977
- Sophronica subcamerunica Breuning, 1969
- Sophronica subcarissae Breuning, 1968
- Sophronica subcephalotes Breuning, 1954
- Sophronica subdivisa Breuning, 1940
- Sophronica subfuscoapicalis Breuning, 1952
- Sophronica subfuscoscapa Breuning, 1964
- Sophronica subgrossepuncticollis Breuning, 1972
- Sophronica subhumeralis Breuning, 1958
- Sophronica subimproba Breuning, 1981
- Sophronica subparallela Breuning, 1970
- Sophronica subproba Breuning, 1959
- Sophronica substriatipennis Hunt & Breuning, 1957
- Sophronica subternigra Breuning, 1986
- Sophronica sudanica Breuning, 1962
- Sophronica sundukovi Danilevsky, 2009
- Sophronica suturalis Aurivillius, 1924
- Sophronica suturella Breuning, 1940
- Sophronica suturevittata Breuning, 1954
- Sophronica tafoensis Breuning, 1978
- Sophronica talhouki Holzschuh & Téocchi, 1991
- Sophronica taverniersi Breuning, 1973
- Sophronica testacea Gahan, 1898
- Sophronica tonkinensis Breuning, 1975
- Sophronica trifuscoplagiata Breuning, 1954
- Sophronica undulata Breuning, 1943
- Sophronica uninigromaculipennis Breuning, 1968
- Sophronica variantennata Breuning,
- Sophronica ventralis Aurivillius, 1925
- Sophronica venzoi Breuning, 1940
- Sophronica villiersi Breuning, 1948
- Sophronica vitticollis Breuning, 1981
- Sophronica vittipennis Breuning, 1966
- Sophronica wittmeri Holzschuh, 1992
