= Sophronica angusticollis =

Scientific classification
- Domain: Eukaryota
- Kingdom: Animalia
- Phylum: Arthropoda
- Class: Insecta
- Order: Coleoptera
- Suborder: Polyphaga
- Infraorder: Cucujiformia
- Family: Cerambycidae
- Genus: Sophronica
- Species: S. angusticollis

Binomial name
- Sophronica angusticollis Aurivillius, 1928

Synonyms
- Sophronica augusticollis Aurivillius, 1928 (misspelling)

Species of beetle

Sophronica angusticollis is a species of beetle in the family Cerambycidae. It was described by Per Olof Christopher Aurivillius in 1928.

== Distribution ==
It is known from Somalia, Ethiopia, Tanzania, and Kenya.

== Subspecies ==
- Sophronica angusticollis angusticollis Aurivillius, 1928
- Sophronica angusticollis boreana Müller, 1939
