= Sophronica gracillima =

Scientific classification
- Kingdom: Animalia
- Phylum: Arthropoda
- Class: Insecta
- Order: Coleoptera
- Suborder: Polyphaga
- Infraorder: Cucujiformia
- Family: Cerambycidae
- Genus: Sophronica
- Species: S. gracillima

Binomial name
- Sophronica gracillima Breuning, 1943

Species of beetle

Sophronica gracillima is a species of beetle in the family Cerambycidae. It is commonly shortened to sophronica. It was described by Stephan von Breuning in 1943.
