= Sophronica postscutellaris =

Scientific classification
- Kingdom: Animalia
- Phylum: Arthropoda
- Class: Insecta
- Order: Coleoptera
- Suborder: Polyphaga
- Infraorder: Cucujiformia
- Family: Cerambycidae
- Genus: Sophronica
- Species: S. postscutellaris

Binomial name
- Sophronica postscutellaris Breuning, 1954

Species of beetle

Sophronica postscutellaris is a species of beetle of the genus Sophronica, in the family Cerambycidae. It was described by Stephan von Breuning in 1954.
