= Sophronica sundukovi =

Scientific classification
- Kingdom: Animalia
- Phylum: Arthropoda
- Clade: Pancrustacea
- Class: Insecta
- Order: Coleoptera
- Suborder: Polyphaga
- Infraorder: Cucujiformia
- Family: Cerambycidae
- Genus: Sophronica
- Species: S. sundukovi

Binomial name
- Sophronica sundukovi Danilevsky, 2009

Species of beetle

Sophronica sundukovi is a species of beetle in the family Cerambycidae. It was described by Mikhail Leontievich Danilevsky in 2009. It is known from North Korea and Russia.
