= Sophronica rubroscapa =

Scientific classification
- Kingdom: Animalia
- Phylum: Arthropoda
- Class: Insecta
- Order: Coleoptera
- Suborder: Polyphaga
- Infraorder: Cucujiformia
- Family: Cerambycidae
- Genus: Sophronica
- Species: S. rubroscapa

Binomial name
- Sophronica rubroscapa Hunt & Breuning, 1966

Species of beetle

Sophronica rubroscapa is a species of beetle in the family Cerambycidae. It was described by Hunt and Stephan von Breuning in 1966.
