= Sophronica bipuncticollis =

Scientific classification
- Kingdom: Animalia
- Phylum: Arthropoda
- Class: Insecta
- Order: Coleoptera
- Suborder: Polyphaga
- Infraorder: Cucujiformia
- Family: Cerambycidae
- Genus: Sophronica
- Species: S. bipuncticollis

Binomial name
- Sophronica bipuncticollis Breuning, 1959

Synonyms
- Sophronica bimaculicollis Breuning, 1970; Sophronica bipuncticollis Breuning, 1959; Sophronica cuprescens Breuning, 1986

Species of beetle

Sophronica bipuncticollis is a species of beetle in the family Cerambycidae. It was described by Stephan von Breuning in 1959.
