= Sophronica bimaculipennis =

Scientific classification
- Kingdom: Animalia
- Phylum: Arthropoda
- Class: Insecta
- Order: Coleoptera
- Suborder: Polyphaga
- Infraorder: Cucujiformia
- Family: Cerambycidae
- Genus: Sophronica
- Species: S. bimaculipennis

Binomial name
- Sophronica bimaculipennis (Breuning, 1955)

Synonyms
- Sophronica uninigromaculipennis Breuning, 1968; Sophronisca bimaculipennis Breuning, 1955; Sophronica besnardi Breuning, 1971; Sophronica uninigromaculipennis m. besnardi Breuning, 1971

Species of beetle

Sophronica bimaculipennis is a species of beetle in the family Cerambycidae. It was described by Stephan von Breuning in 1955, originally under the genus Sophronisca. It is known from Ghana, the Ivory Coast, and Guinea. It contains the varietas Sophronica bimaculipennis var. besnardi.
