= Sophronica ventralis =

Scientific classification
- Domain: Eukaryota
- Kingdom: Animalia
- Phylum: Arthropoda
- Class: Insecta
- Order: Coleoptera
- Suborder: Polyphaga
- Infraorder: Cucujiformia
- Family: Cerambycidae
- Genus: Sophronica
- Species: S. ventralis

Binomial name
- Sophronica ventralis Aurivillius, 1925

Synonyms
- Sophronica curta Breuning, 1939

Species of beetle

Sophronica ventralis is a species of beetle in the family Cerambycidae. It was described by Per Olof Christopher Aurivillius in 1925.
