= Sophronica pienaari =

Scientific classification
- Domain: Eukaryota
- Kingdom: Animalia
- Phylum: Arthropoda
- Class: Insecta
- Order: Coleoptera
- Suborder: Polyphaga
- Infraorder: Cucujiformia
- Family: Cerambycidae
- Genus: Sophronica
- Species: S. pienaari

Binomial name
- Sophronica pienaari Distant, 1898

Species of beetle

Sophronica pienaari is a species of beetle in the family Cerambycidae. It was described by William Lucas Distant in 1898.

Its larvae usually drills into wood and can cause damage to live logs or logged wood.
