= Sophronica suturella =

Scientific classification
- Kingdom: Animalia
- Phylum: Arthropoda
- Class: Insecta
- Order: Coleoptera
- Suborder: Polyphaga
- Infraorder: Cucujiformia
- Family: Cerambycidae
- Genus: Sophronica
- Species: S. suturella

Binomial name
- Sophronica suturella Breuning, 1940

Species of beetle

Sophronica suturella is a species of beetle in the family Cerambycidae. It was described by Stephan von Breuning in 1940.
