= Sophronica amplipennis =

Scientific classification
- Domain: Eukaryota
- Kingdom: Animalia
- Phylum: Arthropoda
- Class: Insecta
- Order: Coleoptera
- Suborder: Polyphaga
- Infraorder: Cucujiformia
- Family: Cerambycidae
- Genus: Sophronica
- Species: S. amplipennis

Binomial name
- Sophronica amplipennis Pascoe, 1888

Synonyms
- Sophronica lamottei Lepesme & Breuning, 1952

Species of beetle

Sophronica amplipennis is a species of beetle in the family Cerambycidae. It was described by Francis Polkinghorne Pascoe in 1888.

== Varietas ==
- Sophronica amplipennis var. rufoampliata Breuning, 1952
- Sophronica amplipennis var. rufulipennis Breuning, 1951
