= Sophronica subdivisa =

Scientific classification
- Kingdom: Animalia
- Phylum: Arthropoda
- Class: Insecta
- Order: Coleoptera
- Suborder: Polyphaga
- Infraorder: Cucujiformia
- Family: Cerambycidae
- Genus: Sophronica
- Species: S. subdivisa

Binomial name
- Sophronica subdivisa Breuning, 1940

Species of beetle

Sophronica subdivisa is a species of beetle in the family Cerambycidae. It was first described by Stephan von Breuning in 1940.

== Subspecies ==
- Sophronica subdivisa invitticollis Breuning, 1976
- Sophronica subdivisa subdivisa Breuning, 1940
