= Sophronica ochreovertex =

Scientific classification
- Kingdom: Animalia
- Phylum: Arthropoda
- Clade: Pancrustacea
- Class: Insecta
- Order: Coleoptera
- Suborder: Polyphaga
- Infraorder: Cucujiformia
- Family: Cerambycidae
- Genus: Sophronica
- Species: S. ochreovertex

Binomial name
- Sophronica ochreovertex Breuning, 1967

Species of beetle

Sophronica ochreovertex is a species of beetle in the family Cerambycidae. It was described by Stephan von Breuning in 1967. The type locality was identified as Élisabethville, now known as Lubumbashi in the Democratic Republic of the Congo.
