= Sophronica calceoides =

Scientific classification
- Kingdom: Animalia
- Phylum: Arthropoda
- Class: Insecta
- Order: Coleoptera
- Suborder: Polyphaga
- Infraorder: Cucujiformia
- Family: Cerambycidae
- Genus: Sophronica
- Species: S. calceoides

Binomial name
- Sophronica calceoides Lepesme & Breuning, 1952

Species of beetle

Sophronica calceoides is a species of beetle in the family Cerambycidae. It was described by Lepesme & Stephan von Breuning in 1952.
