= Sophronica rufiniceps =

Scientific classification
- Kingdom: Animalia
- Phylum: Arthropoda
- Class: Insecta
- Order: Coleoptera
- Suborder: Polyphaga
- Infraorder: Cucujiformia
- Family: Cerambycidae
- Genus: Sophronica
- Species: S. rufiniceps

Binomial name
- Sophronica rufiniceps Breuning, 1949

Synonyms
- Sophronica ruficeps Breuning, 1948 nec Breuning, 1940

Species of beetle

Sophronica rufiniceps is a species of beetle in the family Cerambycidae. It was described by Stephan von Breuning in 1949. It is known from the Central African Republic, Angola, the Ivory Coast, the Democratic Republic of the Congo, Cameroon, and Uganda.

== Subspecies ==
- Sophronica rufiniceps dundensis Breuning, 1959
- Sophronica rufiniceps rufiniceps Breuning, 1949
