= Sophronica richardmolardi =

Scientific classification
- Kingdom: Animalia
- Phylum: Arthropoda
- Class: Insecta
- Order: Coleoptera
- Suborder: Polyphaga
- Infraorder: Cucujiformia
- Family: Cerambycidae
- Genus: Sophronica
- Species: S. richardmolardi

Binomial name
- Sophronica richardmolardi Lepesme & Breuning, 1952

Species of beetle

Sophronica richardmolardi is a species of beetle in the family Cerambycidae. It was described by Lepesme and Breuning in 1952.
