= Sophronica rufobasiantennalis =

Scientific classification
- Kingdom: Animalia
- Phylum: Arthropoda
- Class: Insecta
- Order: Coleoptera
- Suborder: Polyphaga
- Infraorder: Cucujiformia
- Family: Cerambycidae
- Genus: Sophronica
- Species: S. rufobasiantennalis

Binomial name
- Sophronica rufobasiantennalis Breuning, 1948

Synonyms
- Sophronica rufobasiantennalis m. exocentroides Breuning & Teocchi

Species of beetle

Sophronica rufobasiantennalis is a species of beetle in the family Cerambycidae. It was described by Stephan von Breuning in 1948. It contains the varietas Sophronica rufobasiantennalis var. ovalis.
