= Sophronica mirei =

Scientific classification
- Kingdom: Animalia
- Phylum: Arthropoda
- Class: Insecta
- Order: Coleoptera
- Suborder: Polyphaga
- Infraorder: Cucujiformia
- Family: Cerambycidae
- Genus: Sophronica
- Species: S. mirei

Binomial name
- Sophronica mirei Breuning & Villiers, 1960

Species of beetle

Sophronica mirei is a species of beetle in the family Cerambycidae. It was described by Stephan von Breuning and Villiers in 1960.
