= Sophronica improba =

Scientific classification
- Domain: Eukaryota
- Kingdom: Animalia
- Phylum: Arthropoda
- Class: Insecta
- Order: Coleoptera
- Suborder: Polyphaga
- Infraorder: Cucujiformia
- Family: Cerambycidae
- Genus: Sophronica
- Species: S. improba

Binomial name
- Sophronica improba (Pascoe 1858)

Synonyms
- Dasyo improba Pascoe, 1858

Species of beetle

Sophronica improba is a species of beetle in the family Cerambycidae. It was described by Francis Polkinghorne Pascoe.
