= Sophronica rufoscapa =

Scientific classification
- Domain: Eukaryota
- Kingdom: Animalia
- Phylum: Arthropoda
- Class: Insecta
- Order: Coleoptera
- Suborder: Polyphaga
- Infraorder: Cucujiformia
- Family: Cerambycidae
- Genus: Sophronica
- Species: S. rufoscapa

Binomial name
- Sophronica rufoscapa Aurivillius, 1907

Synonyms
- Sophronica lineatopunctata Pic, 1944

Species of beetle

Sophronica rufoscapa is a species of beetle in the family Cerambycidae. It was described by Per Olof Christopher Aurivillius in 1907.
