= Sophronica diversipes =

Scientific classification
- Kingdom: Animalia
- Phylum: Arthropoda
- Class: Insecta
- Order: Coleoptera
- Suborder: Polyphaga
- Infraorder: Cucujiformia
- Family: Cerambycidae
- Genus: Sophronica
- Species: S. diversipes

Binomial name
- Sophronica diversipes (Pic, 1929)

Species of beetle

Sophronica diversipes is a species of beetle in the family Cerambycidae. It was described by Maurice Pic in 1929.
