= Sophronica flavescens =

Scientific classification
- Kingdom: Animalia
- Phylum: Arthropoda
- Class: Insecta
- Order: Coleoptera
- Suborder: Polyphaga
- Infraorder: Cucujiformia
- Family: Cerambycidae
- Genus: Sophronica
- Species: S. flavescens

Binomial name
- Sophronica flavescens Breuning, 1981

Synonyms
- Sophronica subflavescens Forschhammer & Breuning, 1986

Species of beetle

Sophronica flavescens is a species of beetle in the family Cerambycidae. It was described by Stephan von Breuning in 1981.
