= Sophronica reducta =

Scientific classification
- Domain: Eukaryota
- Kingdom: Animalia
- Phylum: Arthropoda
- Class: Insecta
- Order: Coleoptera
- Suborder: Polyphaga
- Infraorder: Cucujiformia
- Family: Cerambycidae
- Genus: Sophronica
- Species: S. reducta

Binomial name
- Sophronica reducta Pascoe, 1888

Species of beetle

Sophronica reducta is a species of beetle in the family Cerambycidae. It was described by Francis Polkinghorne Pascoe in 1888.
