= Sophronica grisea =

Scientific classification
- Domain: Eukaryota
- Kingdom: Animalia
- Phylum: Arthropoda
- Class: Insecta
- Order: Coleoptera
- Suborder: Polyphaga
- Infraorder: Cucujiformia
- Family: Cerambycidae
- Genus: Sophronica
- Species: S. grisea

Binomial name
- Sophronica grisea Aurivillius, 1908

Synonyms
- Sophronica cherenensis Pic, 1944; Sophronica obscuripes Aurivillius, 1908

Species of beetle

Sophronica grisea is a species of beetle in the family Cerambycidae. It was described by Per Olof Christopher Aurivillius in 1908.

== Subspecies ==
- Sophronica grisea grisea Aurivillius, 1908
- Sophronica grisea subannulicornis Breuning, 1968
