= Sophronica sericans =

Scientific classification
- Kingdom: Animalia
- Phylum: Arthropoda
- Class: Insecta
- Order: Coleoptera
- Suborder: Polyphaga
- Infraorder: Cucujiformia
- Family: Cerambycidae
- Genus: Sophronica
- Species: S. sericans

Binomial name
- Sophronica sericans Breuning, 1940

Synonyms
- Sophronica nigra Breuning, 1940; Sophronica paraflavipennis Breuning, 1977; Sophronica partefuscipennis Breuning, 1967

Species of beetle

Sophronica sericans is a species of beetle in the family Cerambycidae. It was described by Stephan von Breuning in 1940.
