= Sophronica talhouki =

Scientific classification
- Domain: Eukaryota
- Kingdom: Animalia
- Phylum: Arthropoda
- Class: Insecta
- Order: Coleoptera
- Suborder: Polyphaga
- Infraorder: Cucujiformia
- Family: Cerambycidae
- Genus: Sophronica
- Species: S. talhouki

Binomial name
- Sophronica talhouki Holzschuh & Téocchi, 1991

Species of beetle

Sophronica talhouki is a species of beetle in the family Cerambycidae. It was described by Holzschuh and Téocchi in 1991.
