= Sophronica cantaloubei =

Scientific classification
- Kingdom: Animalia
- Phylum: Arthropoda
- Clade: Pancrustacea
- Class: Insecta
- Order: Coleoptera
- Suborder: Polyphaga
- Infraorder: Cucujiformia
- Family: Cerambycidae
- Genus: Sophronica
- Species: S. cantaloubei

Binomial name
- Sophronica cantaloubei Breuning, 1958

Species of beetle

Sophronica cantaloubei is a species of beetle in the family Cerambycidae. It was described by Stephan von Breuning in 1958. It is most commonly seen in Central-Africa.
