= Sophronica camerunica =

Scientific classification
- Kingdom: Animalia
- Phylum: Arthropoda
- Class: Insecta
- Order: Coleoptera
- Suborder: Polyphaga
- Infraorder: Cucujiformia
- Family: Cerambycidae
- Genus: Sophronica
- Species: S. camerunica

Binomial name
- Sophronica camerunica Breuning, 1959

Synonyms
- Sophronica camerunica var. funesta Teocchi & Sudre, 2002; Sophronica varicornis Breuning, 1952

Species of beetle

Sophronica camerunica is a species of beetle in the family Cerambycidae. It was described by Stephan von Breuning in 1959.
