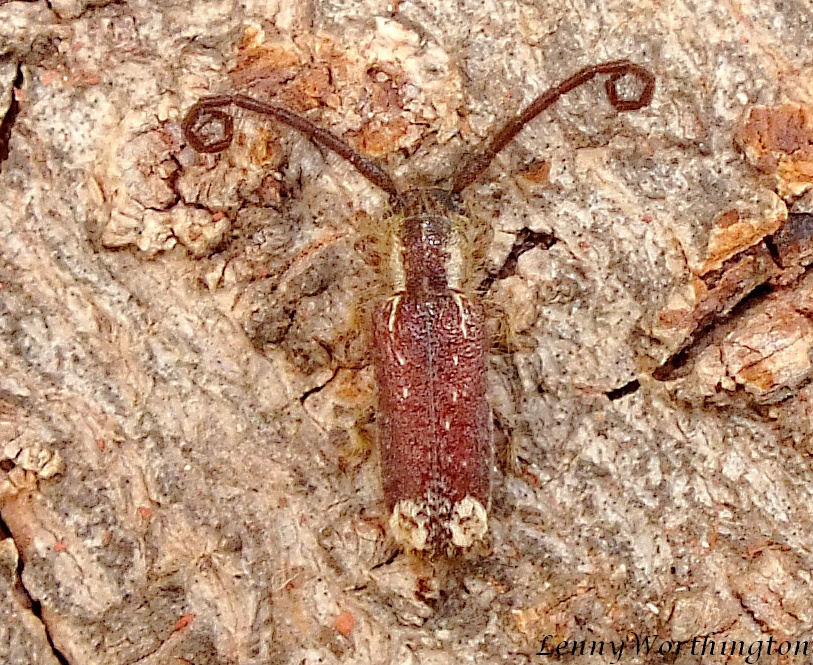

Scientific classification
- Kingdom: Animalia
- Phylum: Arthropoda
- Class: Insecta
- Order: Coleoptera
- Suborder: Polyphaga
- Infraorder: Cucujiformia
- Family: Cerambycidae
- Genus: Sophronica
- Species: S. apicalis

Binomial name
- Sophronica apicalis Pic, 1922

= Sophronica apicalis =

Species of beetle

Sophronica apicalis is a species of beetle in the family Cerambycidae. It was described by Maurice Pic in 1922.
