= Sophronica nigritarsis =

Scientific classification
- Kingdom: Animalia
- Phylum: Arthropoda
- Class: Insecta
- Order: Coleoptera
- Suborder: Polyphaga
- Infraorder: Cucujiformia
- Family: Cerambycidae
- Genus: Sophronica
- Species: S. nigritarsis

Binomial name
- Sophronica nigritarsis Báguena & Breuning, 1958

Species of beetle

Sophronica nigritarsis is a species of beetle in the family Cerambycidae. It was described by Báguena and Stephan von Breuning in 1958.
