= Nyoma fuscomaculata =

Scientific classification
- Kingdom: Animalia
- Phylum: Arthropoda
- Class: Insecta
- Order: Coleoptera
- Suborder: Polyphaga
- Infraorder: Cucujiformia
- Family: Cerambycidae
- Genus: Nyoma
- Species: N. fuscomaculata

Binomial name
- Nyoma fuscomaculata (Breuning, 1971)

Synonyms
- Sophroniella fuscomaculata Breuning, 1971

Species of beetle

Nyoma fuscomaculata is a species of beetle in the family Cerambycidae. It was described by Stephan von Breuning in 1971. It is known from Mozambique and Zimbabwe.
