= Nyoma kyamburensis =

Scientific classification
- Domain: Eukaryota
- Kingdom: Animalia
- Phylum: Arthropoda
- Class: Insecta
- Order: Coleoptera
- Suborder: Polyphaga
- Infraorder: Cucujiformia
- Family: Cerambycidae
- Genus: Nyoma
- Species: N. kyamburensis

Binomial name
- Nyoma kyamburensis Adlbauer, 1998

Species of beetle

Nyoma kyamburensis is a species of beetle in the family Cerambycidae. It was described by Adlbauer in 1998. It is known from Uganda.
