= Nyoma fuscosignata =

Scientific classification
- Kingdom: Animalia
- Phylum: Arthropoda
- Class: Insecta
- Order: Coleoptera
- Suborder: Polyphaga
- Infraorder: Cucujiformia
- Family: Cerambycidae
- Genus: Nyoma
- Species: N. fuscosignata

Binomial name
- Nyoma fuscosignata (Breuning, 1948)

Synonyms
- Falsapomecyna camerunensis Breuning, 1956; Nyoma camerunensis (Breuning, 1956); Ropica postmaculata Breuning, 1978; Sophroniella acutipennis Breuning, 1961; Sophroniella fuscosignata Breuning, 1948; Sophroniella obliquevittata Breuning, 1959; Sybrinus (Arabosybrinus) albomarmoratus Breuning, 1978

Species of beetle

Nyoma fuscosignata is a species of beetle in the family Cerambycidae. It was described by Stephan von Breuning in 1948, originally under the genus Sophroniella. It is known from Ghana, the Ivory Coast, and the Democratic Republic of the Congo.
