= Nyoma (beetle) =

Scientific classification
- Domain: Eukaryota
- Kingdom: Animalia
- Phylum: Arthropoda
- Class: Insecta
- Order: Coleoptera
- Suborder: Polyphaga
- Infraorder: Cucujiformia
- Family: Cerambycidae
- Subfamily: Lamiinae
- Tribe: Desmiphorini
- Genus: Nyoma; Duvivier, 1892

Genus of beetles

Nyoma is a genus of longhorn beetles of the subfamily Lamiinae, containing the following species:

- Nyoma albopunctata Breuning, 1977
- Nyoma costata (Breuning, 1949)
- Nyoma fuscomaculata (Breuning, 1971)
- Nyoma fuscosignata (Breuning, 1948)
- Nyoma kyamburensis Adlbauer, 1998
- Nyoma papiella Quentin & Villiers, 1981
- Nyoma parallela Duvivier, 1892
- Nyoma pusilla (Breuning, 1943)
