= Nyoma albopunctata =

Scientific classification
- Kingdom: Animalia
- Phylum: Arthropoda
- Class: Insecta
- Order: Coleoptera
- Suborder: Polyphaga
- Infraorder: Cucujiformia
- Family: Cerambycidae
- Genus: Nyoma
- Species: N. albopunctata

Binomial name
- Nyoma albopunctata Breuning, 1977

Synonyms
- Sophroniella albopunctata Breuning, 1977

Species of beetle

Nyoma albopunctata is a species of beetle in the family Cerambycidae. It was described by Stephan von Breuning in 1977.
