= Nyoma parallela =

Scientific classification
- Kingdom: Animalia
- Phylum: Arthropoda
- Class: Insecta
- Order: Coleoptera
- Suborder: Polyphaga
- Infraorder: Cucujiformia
- Family: Cerambycidae
- Genus: Nyoma
- Species: N. parallela

Binomial name
- Nyoma parallela Duvivier, 1892

Synonyms
- Sophronica punctata Jordan, 1894; Sophroniella marmorata Breuning, 1948; Sophroniella punctata (Jordan)

Species of beetle

Nyoma parallela is a species of beetle in the family Cerambycidae. It was described by Duvivier in 1892. It is known from the Democratic Republic of the Congo.
