= Nyoma pusilla =

Scientific classification
- Kingdom: Animalia
- Phylum: Arthropoda
- Class: Insecta
- Order: Coleoptera
- Suborder: Polyphaga
- Infraorder: Cucujiformia
- Family: Cerambycidae
- Genus: Nyoma
- Species: N. pusilla

Binomial name
- Nyoma pusilla (Breuning, 1943)

Synonyms
- Sophroniella pusilla Breuning, 1943

Species of beetle

Nyoma pusilla is a species of beetle in the family Cerambycidae. It was described by Stephan von Breuning in 1943, originally under the genus Sophroniella.
