= Ancita marginicollis =

Scientific classification
- Domain: Eukaryota
- Kingdom: Animalia
- Phylum: Arthropoda
- Class: Insecta
- Order: Coleoptera
- Suborder: Polyphaga
- Infraorder: Cucujiformia
- Family: Cerambycidae
- Genus: Ancita
- Species: A. marginicollis

Binomial name
- Ancita marginicollis (Boisduval, 1835)

Synonyms
- Hebesecis marginicollis (Boisduval) Pascoe, 1865

Species of beetle

Ancita marginicollis is a species of beetle in the family Cerambycidae. It was described by Jean Baptiste Boisduval in 1835. It is known from Australia.
