= Ancita antennata =

Scientific classification
- Domain: Eukaryota
- Kingdom: Animalia
- Phylum: Arthropoda
- Class: Insecta
- Order: Coleoptera
- Suborder: Polyphaga
- Infraorder: Cucujiformia
- Family: Cerambycidae
- Genus: Ancita
- Species: A. antennata

Binomial name
- Ancita antennata (Pascoe, 1865)

Synonyms
- Hebesecis antennata Pascoe, 1865

Species of beetle

Ancita antennata is a species of beetle in the family Cerambycidae. It was described by Francis Polkinghorne Pascoe in 1865. It is known from Australia.
