= Ancita fasciculata =

Scientific classification
- Kingdom: Animalia
- Phylum: Arthropoda
- Clade: Pancrustacea
- Class: Insecta
- Order: Coleoptera
- Suborder: Polyphaga
- Infraorder: Cucujiformia
- Family: Cerambycidae
- Genus: Ancita
- Species: A. fasciculata

Binomial name
- Ancita fasciculata (Blackburn, 1893)

Synonyms
- Hebesecis fasciculatus Blackburn, 1893; Hebecerus fasciculatus (Blackburn, 1893)

Species of beetle

Ancita fasciculata or Hebecerus fasciculatus is a species of beetle in the family Cerambycidae. It was described by Thomas Blackburn in 1893. It is known from Australia.
