= Ancita paravaricornis =

Scientific classification
- Kingdom: Animalia
- Phylum: Arthropoda
- Class: Insecta
- Order: Coleoptera
- Suborder: Polyphaga
- Infraorder: Cucujiformia
- Family: Cerambycidae
- Genus: Ancita
- Species: A. paravaricornis

Binomial name
- Ancita paravaricornis Breuning, 1968

Species of beetle

Ancita paravaricornis is a species of beetle in the family Cerambycidae. It was described by Stephan von Breuning in 1968. It is known from Australia.
