= Ancita anisocera =

Scientific classification
- Domain: Eukaryota
- Kingdom: Animalia
- Phylum: Arthropoda
- Class: Insecta
- Order: Coleoptera
- Suborder: Polyphaga
- Infraorder: Cucujiformia
- Family: Cerambycidae
- Genus: Ancita
- Species: A. anisocera

Binomial name
- Ancita anisocera Pascoe, 1875

Species of beetle

Ancita anisocera is a species of beetle in the family Cerambycidae. It was described by Francis Polkinghorne Pascoe in 1875 and is known to be from Australia.
