= Ancita germari =

Scientific classification
- Domain: Eukaryota
- Kingdom: Animalia
- Phylum: Arthropoda
- Class: Insecta
- Order: Coleoptera
- Suborder: Polyphaga
- Infraorder: Cucujiformia
- Family: Cerambycidae
- Genus: Ancita
- Species: A. germari

Binomial name
- Ancita germari (Pascoe, 1865)

Synonyms
- Hebesecis germari Pascoe, 1865

Species of beetle

Ancita germari is a species of beetle in the family Cerambycidae. It was described by Francis Polkinghorne Pascoe in 1865. It is found in Australia.
