= Ancita ochraceovittata =

Scientific classification
- Kingdom: Animalia
- Phylum: Arthropoda
- Class: Insecta
- Order: Coleoptera
- Suborder: Polyphaga
- Infraorder: Cucujiformia
- Family: Cerambycidae
- Genus: Ancita
- Species: A. ochraceovittata

Binomial name
- Ancita ochraceovittata Breuning, 1936

Species of beetle

Ancita ochraceovittata is a species of beetle in the family Cerambycidae. It was described by Stephan von Breuning in 1936. It is indigenous to Papua New Guinea.
