= Ancita didyma =

Scientific classification
- Domain: Eukaryota
- Kingdom: Animalia
- Phylum: Arthropoda
- Class: Insecta
- Order: Coleoptera
- Suborder: Polyphaga
- Infraorder: Cucujiformia
- Family: Cerambycidae
- Genus: Ancita
- Species: A. didyma

Binomial name
- Ancita didyma Blackburn, 1901

Species of beetle

Ancita didyma is a species of beetle in the family Cerambycidae. It was described by Blackburn in 1901. It is known from Australia.
