= Ancita varicornis =

Scientific classification
- Domain: Eukaryota
- Kingdom: Animalia
- Phylum: Arthropoda
- Class: Insecta
- Order: Coleoptera
- Suborder: Polyphaga
- Infraorder: Cucujiformia
- Family: Cerambycidae
- Genus: Ancita
- Species: A. varicornis

Binomial name
- Ancita varicornis (Germar, 1848)

Synonyms
- Crossotus varicornis Germar, 1848

Species of beetle

Ancita varicornis is a species of beetle in the family Cerambycidae. It was described by Ernst Friedrich Germar in 1848. It is known from Australia.
