= Ancita longicornis =

Scientific classification
- Domain: Eukaryota
- Kingdom: Animalia
- Phylum: Arthropoda
- Class: Insecta
- Order: Coleoptera
- Suborder: Polyphaga
- Infraorder: Cucujiformia
- Family: Cerambycidae
- Genus: Ancita
- Species: A. longicornis

Binomial name
- Ancita longicornis McKeown, 1948

Species of beetle

Ancita longicornis is a species of beetle in the family Cerambycidae. It was described by McKeown in 1948. It is known from Australia.
