= Ancita =

Scientific classification
- Domain: Eukaryota
- Kingdom: Animalia
- Phylum: Arthropoda
- Class: Insecta
- Order: Coleoptera
- Suborder: Polyphaga
- Infraorder: Cucujiformia
- Family: Cerambycidae
- Tribe: Desmiphorini
- Genus: Ancita; Thomson, 1864

Genus of beetles

Ancita is a genus of longhorn beetles of the subfamily Lamiinae, containing the following species:

- Ancita albescens Breuning, 1938
- Ancita anisocera Pascoe, 1875
- Ancita anisoceroides Breuning, 1978
- Ancita antennata (Pascoe, 1865)
- Ancita australica (Breuning, 1982)
- Ancita australis (Boisduval, 1835)
- Ancita basalis (Pascoe, 1867)
- Ancita basicristata Breuning, 1970
- Ancita cristata (Pascoe, 1875)
- Ancita crocogaster (Boisduval, 1835)
- Ancita didyma Blackburn, 1901
- Ancita fasciculata (Blackburn, 1893)
- Ancita fuscicornis (Germar, 1848)
- Ancita germari (Pascoe, 1865)
- Ancita lineola (Newman, 1851)
- Ancita longicornis McKeown, 1948
- Ancita major Breuning, 1968
- Ancita marginicollis (Boisduval, 1835)
- Ancita niphonoides (Pascoe, 1863)
- Ancita ochraceovittata Breuning, 1936
- Ancita paranisocera Breuning, 1970
- Ancita parantennata Breuning, 1970
- Ancita paravaricornis Breuning, 1968
- Ancita penicillata Aurivillius, 1917
- Ancita setosa Breuning, 1940
- Ancita similis Breuning, 1938
- Ancita varicornis (Germar, 1848)
