= Ancita australica =

Scientific classification
- Domain: Eukaryota
- Kingdom: Animalia
- Phylum: Arthropoda
- Class: Insecta
- Order: Coleoptera
- Suborder: Polyphaga
- Infraorder: Cucujiformia
- Family: Cerambycidae
- Genus: Ancita
- Species: A. australica

Binomial name
- Ancita australica (Breuning, 1982)

Synonyms
- Australiorondonia australica Breuning, 1982

Species of beetle

Ancita australica is a species of beetle in the family Cerambycidae. It was described by Stephan von Breuning in 1982. It is known from Australia.
