= Ancita lineola =

Scientific classification
- Domain: Eukaryota
- Kingdom: Animalia
- Phylum: Arthropoda
- Class: Insecta
- Order: Coleoptera
- Suborder: Polyphaga
- Infraorder: Cucujiformia
- Family: Cerambycidae
- Genus: Ancita
- Species: A. lineola

Binomial name
- Ancita lineola (Newman, 1851)

Synonyms
- Hebecerus sparsus Pascoe, 1865

Species of beetle

Ancita lineola is a species of beetle in the family Cerambycidae. It was described by Newman in 1851. It is known from Australia.
