= Ancita niphonoides =

Scientific classification
- Domain: Eukaryota
- Kingdom: Animalia
- Phylum: Arthropoda
- Class: Insecta
- Order: Coleoptera
- Suborder: Polyphaga
- Infraorder: Cucujiformia
- Family: Cerambycidae
- Genus: Ancita
- Species: A. niphonoides

Binomial name
- Ancita niphonoides (Pascoe, 1863)

Synonyms
- Ancita crossotoides Thomson, 1864; Ancita dispar Blackburn, 1901; Hebecerus niphonoides Pascoe, 1863

Species of beetle

Ancita niphonoides is a species of beetle in the family Cerambycidae. It was described by Francis Polkinghorne Pascoe in 1863. It is known from Australia.
